The Istanbul mayoral elections of 2014 were held on 30 March 2014 as part of the local elections taking place throughout Turkey on the same day. The Metropolitan Mayor of Istanbul as well as the district mayors of the 39 districts of Istanbul were elected, along with municipal councillors for each district municipality. The metropolitan municipality race was one of the most high-profile and close watched elections in the country, with the Justice and Development Party (AKP) candidate Kadir Topbaş being re-elected for a third consecutive term as mayor with 47.9% of the vote. Mustafa Sarıgül, the Republican People's Party (CHP) candidate, came second with 40% of the vote.

Istanbul Metropolitan Municipality

|- style="background-color:#F2F2F2"
| align="center" colspan="3" | Voters
| align="center" colspan="7" | Ballot boxes
|- align="left"
| align="center" colspan="3" | 9.997.024
| align="center" colspan="7" | 32.165
|-
|- style="background-color:#E9E9E9"
|-
! align="center" colspan="4" | Candidates
! align="center" colspan="6" | Results
|- style="background-color:#E9E9E9"
! align="center" colspan="2"|Abb.
! align="center" | Party
! align="center" | Nominee
! align="center" | Vote
! align="center" | Per.
|- align="left"
|bgcolor="#ED8000" width=1|
| AKP
|Justice and Development Party
| Kadir Topbaş
| 4.100.191
| %47.9
|- align="left"
|bgcolor="#DA251C" width=1|
| CHP
|Republican People's Party
|Mustafa Sarıgül
| 3.427.157
| %40.0
|- align="left"
|bgcolor="#91007B" width=1|
| HDP
| Peoples' Democratic Party
| Sırrı Süreyya Önder
| 412.875 
| %4.83
|- align="left"
|bgcolor="#D20001" width=1|
| MHP
| Nationalist Movement Party
| Rasim Acar
| 339.466  
| %3.97
|- align="left"
|bgcolor="#D02433" width=1|
| SP
| Felicity Party
| Selman Esmerer
| 122.907
| %1.44 
|- align="left"
|bgcolor="#ED1C24" width=1|
| BBP
| Great Union Party
| Ahmet Yelis 
| 47.437
| %0.55
|- align="left"
|bgcolor="#008DD2" width=1|
| YP
| Homeland Party
|  Okan Bal
| 16.610 
| %0.19
|- align="left"
|bgcolor="#BB0000" width=1|
| İP
| Workers' Party
| Levent Kırca
| 15.194
| %0.18
|- align="left"
|bgcolor="#000000" width=1|
| HEPAR
| Rights and Equality Party
|  Ahmet Ercan
| 14.214
| %0.17   
|- align="left"
|bgcolor="#FE0000" width=1|
| BTP
| Independent Turkey Party
| Ahmet Rıdvan Murat
| 10.632
| %0.12
|- align="left"
|bgcolor="#EFDF00" width=1|
| TKP
| Communist Party of Turkey
| Aydemir Güler
| 7.523 
| %0.09
|- align="left"
|bgcolor="#FDFF32" width=1|
| HAK-PAR
| Rights and Freedoms Party
| Mehmet Celal Baykara
| 7.365
| %0.09
|- align="left"
|bgcolor="#01A7E1" width=1|
| DSP
| Democratic Left Party
| Muammer Aydın
| 7.207
| %0.08
|- align="left"
|bgcolor="#9D1D1E" width=1|
| DP
| Democratic Party
|Hüseyin Güler
|5.591
| %0.07
|- align="left"
|bgcolor="#EA1F25" width=1|
| HKP
| People's Liberation Party
| Zeliha Kıran Danacı
|4.346
| %0.05
|- align="left"
|bgcolor="#DA251C" width=1|
| DYP
| True Path Party
|Kemal Abdullahoğlu
|2.339
| %0.03
|- align="left"
|bgcolor="#0C63CA" width=1|
| MP
| Nation Party
| Derviş Doğan
|   2.309
| %0.03
|- align="left"
|bgcolor="#0C4DA2" width=1|
| LDP
| Liberal Democratic Party
|Şule Kılıçarslan
|1.423
| %0.02
|- align="left"
|bgcolor=" " width=1|
| BĞMSZ
| Independent
| Şafak Tanrıverdi
| 1.074
| %0.01
|- align="left"
|bgcolor=" " width=1|
| BĞMSZ
| Independent
| Süleyman Gök
| 654
| %0.00
|- align="left"
|bgcolor=" " width=1|
| BĞMSZ
| Independent
| Burcu Deniz
| 412
| %0.00
|- align="left"
|bgcolor=" " width=1|
| BĞMSZ
|  Independent
| Elif Selen Gülün
| 223
| %0.00
|- align="left"
|bgcolor=" " width=1|
| BĞMSZ
| Independent
| Ümit Kadir Özdemir
| 206
| %0.00
|- align="left"
|bgcolor=" " width=1|
| BĞMSZ
| Independent
| Fatma Ragibe Kanıkuru Loğoğlu
| 189
| %0.00
|- align="left"
|bgcolor=" " width=1|
| BĞMSZ
| Independent
| Nihal Kaya
| 186
| %0.00
|- align="left"
|bgcolor=" " width=1|
| BĞMSZ
|  Independent
| Erdal Karasu
| 155
| %0.00
|- align="left"
|bgcolor=" " width=1|
| BĞMSZ
| Independent
| Celal Çam
| 143
| %0.00
|- align="left"
|bgcolor=" " width=1|
| BĞMSZ
| Independent
| Galip İlhaner
| 140
| %0.00
|- align="left"
|bgcolor=" " width=1|
| BĞMSZ
|  Independent
| Ömer Coşkun
| 137
| %0.00
|- align="left"
|bgcolor=" " width=1|
| BĞMSZ
| Independent
| Ersin Baş
| 133
| %0.00
|- align="left"
|bgcolor=" " width=1|
| BĞMSZ
| Independent
| Halit Aslan
| 132
| %0.00
|- align="left"
|bgcolor=" " width=1|
| BĞMSZ
| Independent
| Kaya Mutlu
| 132
| %0.00 
|- style="background-color:#E9E9E9" align="left"
! align="center" colspan="4" | Total
| align="center" colspan="5" |8.548.702
|- style="background-color:#E9E9E9" align="left"
! align="center" colspan="4" | Invalid votes
| align="center" colspan="5" | 387.313
|- style="background-color:#E9E9E9" align="left"
! align="center" colspan="4" | Turnout
| align="center" colspan="5" |  %89.39
|-
|align="left" colspan=10|Ref.: YSK
|}

Districts

Adalar

|- style="background-color:#F2F2F2"
| align="center" colspan="3" | Voters
| align="center" colspan="7" | Ballot boxes
|- align="left"
| align="center" colspan="3" | 12,369
| align="center" colspan="7" | 45
|-
|- style="background-color:#E9E9E9"
|-
! align="center" colspan="4" | Candidates
! align="center" colspan="6" | Results
|- style="background-color:#E9E9E9"
! align="center" colspan="2"|Abb.
! align="center" | Party
! align="center" | Nominee
! align="center" | Vote
! align="center" | Per.
|- align="left"
|bgcolor="#DA251C" width=1|
| CHP
| Republican People's Party
|Atilla Aytaç
| 5.207
| %50.1
|- align="left"
|bgcolor="#ED8000" width=1|
| AKP
| Justice and Development Party
| Coşkun Özden
| 4.381
| %42.1
|- align="left"
|bgcolor="#91007B" width=1|
| HDP
|Peoples' Democratic Party
| Kayuş Çalıkman Gavrilof
|  391
|  %3.76    
|- align="left"
|bgcolor="#D20001" width=1|
| MHP
|Nationalist Movement Party
| Hülya Azimli
|283
| %2.72
|- align="left"
|bgcolor="#D02433" width=1|
| SP
| Felicity Party
| Mehmet Gökçınar
| 82
| %0.78
|- align="left"
|bgcolor="#BB0000" width=1|
| İP
| Workers' Party
| Adviye Bal
| 15
| %0.14 
|- align="left"
|bgcolor="#ED1C24" width=1|
| BBP
| Great Union Party
| Hüseyin Sedat İnal 
| 12
|  %0.11 
|- align="left"
|bgcolor="#FE0000" width=1|
| BTP
| Independent Turkey Party
| Taner Önel
| 11
| %0.10
|- align="left"
|bgcolor="#01A7E1" width=1|
| DSP
|  Democratic Left Party
| Muammer Melih Civelek
| 3
| %0.02
|- style="background-color:#E9E9E9" align="left"
! align="center" colspan="4" | Total
|align="center" colspan="5" |10.385
|- style="background-color:#E9E9E9" align="left"
! align="center" colspan="4" | Invalid votes
| align="center" colspan="5" |  403
|- style="background-color:#E9E9E9" align="left"
! align="center" colspan="4" | Turnout
| align="center" colspan="5" |  %87.22
|-
|align="left" colspan=10|Ref.: YSK
|}

Arnavutköy

|- style="background-color:#F2F2F2"
| align="center" colspan="3" | Voters
| align="center" colspan="7" | Ballot boxes
|- align="left"
| align="center" colspan="3" | 136,298
| align="center" colspan="7" | 453
|-
|- style="background-color:#E9E9E9"
|-
! align="center" colspan="4" | Candidates
! align="center" colspan="6" | Results
|- style="background-color:#E9E9E9"
! align="center" colspan="2"| Abb.
! align="center" | Party
! align="center" | Nominee
! align="center" | Vote
! align="center" | Per.
|- align="left"
|bgcolor="#ED8000" width=1|
| AKP
| Justice and Development Party
| Ahmet Haşimi Baltacı
| 60.256
| %51.6
|- align="left"
|bgcolor="#D20001" width=1|
| MHP
| Nationalist Movement Party
|  Yüksel Emir
|25.885      
| %22.1
|- align="left"
|bgcolor="#91007B" width=1|
| HDP
| Peoples' Democratic Party
| Harun Kaya
| 13.560 
| %11.6   
|- align="left"
|bgcolor="#DA251C" width=1|
| CHP
|Republican People's Party
|Ruhi Tuncel
| 9.791
| %8.39
|- align="left"
|bgcolor="#D02433" width=1|
| SP
| Felicity Party
| Yusuf Dal
| 4.498
| %3.85
|- align="left"
|bgcolor="#ED1C24" width=1|
| BBP
| Great Union Party
|  Jale İyem
| 1.007
| %0.86
|- align="left"
|bgcolor=" " width=1|
| BĞMSZ
| Independent
| Dilek Aras
| 549
| %0.47
|- align="left"
|bgcolor="#FE0000" width=1|
| BTP
| Independent Turkey Party
| Recayi Özcan
| 433
| %0.37
|- align="left"
|bgcolor="#9D1D1E" width=1|
| DP
| Democratic Party
| Sedat Sakman
| 243 
| %0.20
|- align="left"
|bgcolor="#BB0000" width=1|
| İP
| Workers' Party
| Yılmaz Hikmet Tunçok
| 135
| %0.11
|- align="left"
|bgcolor="#01A7E1" width=1|
| DSP
| Democratic Left Party
| Hikmet Kabuk
| 86
| %0.07
|- align="left"
|bgcolor="#00247C" width=1|
| TURK-P
|Social Reconciliation Reform and Development Party
|Muhittin Özcan Yapıcı
| 83
| %0.07
|- align="left"
|bgcolor="#DA251C" width=1|
| DYP
| True Path Party
|Halil Sarıhan
|60
| %0.05
|- align="left"
|bgcolor="#0C4DA2" width=1|
| LDP
| Liberal Democratic Party
|Selim Aydın 
| 44
| %0.03
|- align="left"
|bgcolor=" " width=1|
| BĞMSZ
| Independent
| Samih Bakan
| 30
| %0.02
|- style="background-color:#E9E9E9" align="left"
! align="center" colspan="4" | Total
|align="center" colspan="5" |116.660
|- style="background-color:#E9E9E9" align="left"
! align="center" colspan="4" | Invalid votes
| align="center" colspan="5" | 7.151 
|- style="background-color:#E9E9E9" align="left"
! align="center" colspan="4" | Turnout
| align="center" colspan="5" |  %90.84
|-
|align="left" colspan=10|Ref.: YSK
|}

Ataşehir

|- style="background-color:#F2F2F2"
| align="center" colspan="3" | Voters
| align="center" colspan="7" | Ballot boxes
|- align="left"
| align="center" colspan="3" | 291,049
| align="center" colspan="7" | 926
|-
|- style="background-color:#E9E9E9"
|-
! align="center" colspan="4" | Candidates
! align="center" colspan="6" | Results
|- style="background-color:#E9E9E9"
! align="center" colspan="2"|Abb.
! align="center" | Party
! align="center" | Nominee
! align="center" | Vote
! align="center" | Per.
|- align="left"
|bgcolor="#DA251C" width=1|
| CHP
| Republican People's Party
| Battal İlgezdi
| 127.018
| %49.6
|- align="left"
|bgcolor="#ED8000" width=1|
| AKP
|  Justice and Development Party
| Nimetullah Topu
| 107.037
| %41.8
|- align="left"
|bgcolor="#D20001" width=1|
| MHP
| Nationalist Movement Party
| Zeki Bulut
|9.652
| %3.77   
|- align="left"
|bgcolor="#91007B" width=1|
| HDP
| Peoples' Democratic Party
| Necibe İnci İncesağır
|  6.626
| %2.59
|- align="left"
|bgcolor="#D02433" width=1|
| SP
| Felicity Party
| Noğman Yüksel
| 2.306
| %0.90   
|- align="left"
|bgcolor="#ED1C24" width=1|
| BBP
| Great Union Party
|  Nafız Kürklü
| 1.368
| %0.53  
|- align="left"
|bgcolor="#BB0000" width=1|
| İP
| Workers’ Party
| Memet Orhan Şenoğlu
| 387 
| %0.15
|- align="left"
|bgcolor="#9D1D1E" width=1|
| DP
| Democratic Party
| Müsemma Özbeğ
| 348
| %0.13
|- align="left"
|bgcolor="#01A7E1" width=1|
| DSP
| Democratic Left Party
| Sadet Garan
| 333
| %0.13
|- align="left"
|bgcolor="#FE0000" width=1|
| BTP
| Independent Turkey Party
| Rahmi Şen
| 230 
| %0.08
|- align="left"
|bgcolor="#00247C" width=1|
| TURK-P
| Social Reconciliation Reform and Development Party
|Mehmet Yeşilkaya
|76
| %0.02
|- align="left"
|bgcolor="#DA251C" width=1|
| DYP
| True Path Party
|Ogün Çağlar
|74
| %0.02
|- align="left"
|bgcolor="#0C4DA2" width=1|
| LDP
| Liberal Democratic Party
| Ali Çavuşoğlu
| 72
| %0.02
|- align="left"
|bgcolor=" " width=1|
| BĞMSZ
| Independent
| Burak Kemal Tanrısever
| 68
| %0.02
|- style="background-color:#E9E9E9" align="left"
! align="center" colspan="4" | Total
|align="center" colspan="5" |255.595
|- style="background-color:#E9E9E9" align="left"
! align="center" colspan="4" | Invalid votes
| align="center" colspan="5" |8.431
|- style="background-color:#E9E9E9" align="left"
! align="center" colspan="4" | Turnout
| align="center" colspan="5" | %90.72 
|-
|align="left" colspan=10|Ref.: YSK
|}

Avcılar

|- style="background-color:#F2F2F2"
| align="center" colspan="3" | Voters
| align="center" colspan="7" | Ballot boxes
|- align="left"
| align="center" colspan="3" | 288,678
| align="center" colspan="7" | 919
|-
|- style="background-color:#E9E9E9"
|-
! align="center" colspan="4" | Candidates
! align="center" colspan="6" | Results
|- style="background-color:#E9E9E9"
! align="center" colspan="2"|Abb.
! align="center" | Party
! align="center" | Nominee
! align="center" | Vote
! align="center" | Per.
|- align="left"
|bgcolor="#DA251C" width=1|
| CHP
| Republican People's Party
| Hanay Handan Toprak Benli
| 106.506
| %44.0
|- align="left"
|bgcolor="#ED8000" width=1|
| AKP
|  Justice and Development Party
| Bayram Şenocak
| 98.904
| %40.8
|- align="left"
|bgcolor="#D20001" width=1|
| MHP
| Nationalist Movement Party
|  İnci Demirel
|22.082
| %9.12   
|- align="left"
|bgcolor="#91007B" width=1|
| HDP
| Peoples' Democratic Party
| Zehra Şahin Yeşil
|  9.539
| %3.94      
|- align="left"
|bgcolor="#D02433" width=1|
| SP
| Felicity Party
| Ender Esiner
|   1.884
| %0.77  
|- align="left"
|bgcolor="#ED1C24" width=1|
| BBP
| Great Union Party
|  Bilal Kiracıoğlu
| 820
| %0.33 
|- align="left"
|bgcolor="#000000" width=1|
| HEPAR
| Rights and Equality Party
|  Emine Serpil Erişir
| 583
| %0.24
|- align="left"
|bgcolor="#008DD2" width=1|
| YP
| Homeland Party
| Saim Topal
| 349
| %0.14
|- align="left"
|bgcolor="#FE0000" width=1|
| BTP
| Independent Turkey Party
| Özcan Cırit
| 329
| %0.13
|- align="left"
|bgcolor="#BB0000" width=1|
| İP
| Workers’ Party
| Tuncer Avcı
| 290
| %0.11
|- align="left"
|bgcolor="#01A7E1" width=1|
| DSP
| Democratic Left Party
| Hanife Neslihan Saraçoğlu Baykara
| 222
| %0.09
|- align="left"
|bgcolor="#9D1D1E" width=1|
| DP
| Democratic Party
| İsmail Bektaş
| 146
| %0.06
|- align="left"
|bgcolor="#EFDF00" width=1|
| TURK-P
| Social Reconciliation Reform and Development Party
| Saadettin Murat Moğul
| 80
| %0.03
|- align="left"
|bgcolor="#0C63CA" width=1|
| MP
| Nation Party
| Muhittin Elmalı
| 71
| %0.02
|- align="left"
|bgcolor="#0C4DA2" width=1|
| LDP
| Liberal Democratic Party
| İsmail Özgür Yıldız
|  67
| %0.02
|- style="background-color:#E9E9E9" align="left"
! align="center" colspan="4" | Total
|align="center" colspan="5" |241.872
|- style="background-color:#E9E9E9" align="left"
! align="center" colspan="4" | Invalid votes
| align="center" colspan="5" | 12.176
|- style="background-color:#E9E9E9" align="left"
! align="center" colspan="4" | Turnout
| align="center" colspan="5" |  %88.00
|-
|align="left" colspan=10|Ref.: YSK
|}

Bağcılar

|- style="background-color:#F2F2F2"
| align="center" colspan="3" | Voters
| align="center" colspan="7" | Ballot boxes
|- align="left"
| align="center" colspan="3" | 500,615
| align="center" colspan="7" | 1585
|-
|- style="background-color:#E9E9E9"
|-
! align="center" colspan="4" | Candidates
! align="center" colspan="6" | Results
|- style="background-color:#E9E9E9"
! align="center" colspan="2"| Abb.
! align="center" | Party
! align="center" | Nominee
! align="center" | Vote
! align="center" | Per.
|- align="left"
|bgcolor="#ED8000" width=1|
| AKP
| Justice and Development Party
| Lokman Çağırıcı
| 242.547
| %57.2
|- align="left"
|bgcolor="#DA251C" width=1|
| CHP
| Republican People's Party 
| Muhammet Çakmak
| 83.483
| %19.7
|- align="left"
|bgcolor="#91007B" width=1|
| HDP
| Peoples' Democratic Party
| Fırat Epözdemir
|  39.641

| %9.36       
|- align="left"
|bgcolor="#D20001" width=1|
| MHP
| Nationalist Movement Party
|  Hacı Murat Yümlü
|28.592
| %6.75
|- align="left"
|bgcolor="#D02433" width=1|
| SP
| Felicity Party
| Mesut Doğan
| 21.731
| %5.13
|- align="left"
|bgcolor="#ED1C24" width=1|
| BBP
| Great Union Party
|  Muhammet Bayram
| 3.426
| %0.80
|- align="left"
|bgcolor="#FE0000" width=1|
| BTP
| Independent Turkey Party
| Mehmet Hakan Akkuş
| 1.352
| %0.31
|- align="left"
|bgcolor="#9D1D1E" width=1|
| DP
| Democratic Party
| Abuzer Mutlu
| 1.167

| %0.27 
|- align="left"
|bgcolor="#BB0000" width=1|
| İP
| Workers’ Party
| Hamiyet Gürsoy
| 579
| %0.13
|- align="left"
|bgcolor="#01A7E1" width=1|
| DSP
| Democratic Left Party
| Haydar Aktaş
| 379
| %0.08
|- align="left"
|bgcolor="#0C63CA" width=1|
| MP
| Nation Party
| Ahmet Aktaş
| 213
| %0.05
|- align="left"
|bgcolor="#0C4DA2" width=1|
| LDP
| Liberal Democratic Party
| Abdülkadir Alçep
| 142
| %0.03
|- align="left"
|bgcolor=" " width=1|
| BĞMSZ
| Independent
| Mustafa Emre Yenici
| 142
| %0.03
|- style="background-color:#E9E9E9" align="left"
! align="center" colspan="4" | Total
|align="center" colspan="5" |423.394
|- style="background-color:#E9E9E9" align="left"
! align="center" colspan="4" | Invalid votes
| align="center" colspan="5" |19.922
|- style="background-color:#E9E9E9" align="left"
! align="center" colspan="4" | Turnout
| align="center" colspan="5" |  %88.55
|-
|align="left" colspan=10|Ref.: YSK
|}

Bahçelievler

|- style="background-color:#F2F2F2"
| align="center" colspan="3" | Voters
| align="center" colspan="7" | Ballot boxes
|- align="left"
| align="center" colspan="3" | 434,089
| align="center" colspan="7" | 1389
|-
|- style="background-color:#E9E9E9"
|-
! align="center" colspan="4" | Candidates
! align="center" colspan="6" | Results
|- style="background-color:#E9E9E9"
! align="center" colspan="2"|Abb.
! align="center" | Party
! align="center" | Nominee
! align="center" | Vote
! align="center" | Per.
|- align="left"
|bgcolor="#ED8000" width=1|
| AKP
| Justice and Development Party
| Osman Develioğlu
| 177.228
| %48.1
|- align="left"
|bgcolor="#DA251C" width=1|
| CHP
|Republican People's Party
|Saffet Bulut
| 130.947
| %35.5
|- align="left"
|bgcolor="#D20001" width=1|
| MHP
| Nationalist Movement Party
|  Halim Küçükali
|22.497
| %6.10
|- align="left"
|bgcolor="#91007B" width=1|
| HDP
| Peoples' Democratic Party
| Servet Öncü
|  22.198
| %6.02
|- align="left"
|bgcolor="#D02433" width=1|
| SP
| Felicity Party
| Ali İhsan Gündoğdu
| 9.328
| %2.53
|- align="left"
|bgcolor="#ED1C24" width=1|
| BBP
| Great Union Party
|  Ali Karahasanoğlu
| 2.788 
| %0.75
|- align="left"
|bgcolor="#9D1D1E" width=1|
| DP
| Democratic Party
| Cemal Yalanız
| 1.196
| %0.32
|- align="left"
|bgcolor="#FE0000" width=1|
| BTP
| Independent Turkey Party
| Murat Gülen
| 662
| %0.17
|- align="left"
|bgcolor="#BB0000" width=1|
| İP
| Workers’ Party
| Hayati Kızılkaya
| 524
| %0.14
|- align="left"
|bgcolor="#01A7E1" width=1|
| DSP
| Democratic Left Party
| Dursun Eryılmaz
| 342
| %0.09
|- align="left"
|bgcolor=" " width=1|
| BĞMSZ
| Independent
| Erkan Eryılmaz
| 185 
| %0.05
|- align="left"
|bgcolor="#0C63CA" width=1|
| MP
| Nation Party
| Hüseyin Abdullahoğlu
| 161
| %0.04
|- align="left"
|bgcolor="#0C4DA2" width=1|
| LDP
| Liberal Democratic Party
| Ziya Çelebi Sinça
| 155
| %0.04
|- style="background-color:#E9E9E9" align="left"
! align="center" colspan="4" | Total
|align="center" colspan="5" | 368.211
|- style="background-color:#E9E9E9" align="left"
! align="center" colspan="4" | Invalid votes
| align="center" colspan="5" |  14.942
|- style="background-color:#E9E9E9" align="left"
! align="center" colspan="4" | Turnout
| align="center" colspan="5" |  %88.27
|-
|align="left" colspan=10|Ref.: YSK
|}

Bakırköy

|- style="background-color:#F2F2F2"
| align="center" colspan="3" | Voters
| align="center" colspan="7" | Ballot boxes
|- align="left"
| align="center" colspan="3" | 173,391
| align="center" colspan="7" | 561
|-
|- style="background-color:#E9E9E9"
|-
! align="center" colspan="4" | Candidates
! align="center" colspan="6" | Results
|- style="background-color:#E9E9E9"
! align="center" colspan="2"|Abb.
! align="center" | Party
! align="center" | Nominee
! align="center" | Vote
! align="center" | Per.
|- align="left"
|bgcolor="#DA251C" width=1|
| CHP
| Republican People's Party
| Bülent Kerimoğlu
| 102.301
| %68.7
|- align="left"
|bgcolor="#ED8000" width=1|
| AKP
|  Justice and Development Party
| Mehmet Emin Ertekin
| 32.719
| %22.0
|- align="left"
|bgcolor="#D20001" width=1|
| MHP
| Nationalist Movement Party
|  Mustafa Turan
|7.893
| %5.30
|- align="left"
|bgcolor="#91007B" width=1|
| HDP
| Peoples' Democratic Party
| Vahit Genç
|  3.023
| %2.03
|- align="left"
|bgcolor="#D02433" width=1|
| SP
| Felicity Party
| Ramazan Boyalık
|  856 
| %0.57
|- align="left"
|bgcolor="#ED1C24" width=1|
| BBP
| Great Union Party
|  Atilla Kucur
| 654
| %0.43
|- align="left"
|bgcolor="#01A7E1" width=1|
| DSP
| Democratic Left Party
| Saffet Şen
| 289
| %0.19
|- align="left"
|bgcolor="#000000" width=1|
| HEPAR
| Rights and Equality Party
| Zekayi Durak 
|  286  
| %0.19
|- align="left"
|bgcolor="#9D1D1E" width=1|
| DP
| Democratic Party
| Filiz Ercan
| 210
| %0.14
|- align="left"
|bgcolor="#FE0000" width=1|
| BTP
| Independent Turkey Party
| Cihangir Aydın
| 125
| %0.08
|- align="left"
|bgcolor="#0C63CA" width=1|
| YP
| Homeland Party
|Serkan Umudum
|112
| %0.07
|- align="left"
|bgcolor="#DA251C" width=1|
| DYP
| True Path Party
|Necmiye Abdullahoğlu
|85
| %0.05
|- align="left"
|bgcolor="#0C4DA2" width=1|
| LDP
| Liberal Democratic Party
| Mustafa Kürşat Çetinkoz
| 61
| %0.04
|- align="left"
|bgcolor=" " width=1|
| BĞMSZ
| Independent
| Ramazan Bayar
| 55
| %0.03
|- align="left"
|bgcolor="#0C63CA" width=1|
| MP
| Nation Party
| Oya Veyis
| 34
| %0.02
|- style="background-color:#E9E9E9" align="left"
! align="center" colspan="4" | Total
|align="center" colspan="5" |148.703
|- style="background-color:#E9E9E9" align="left"
! align="center" colspan="4" | Invalid votes
| align="center" colspan="5" |3.723
|- style="background-color:#E9E9E9" align="left"
! align="center" colspan="4" | Turnout
| align="center" colspan="5" |  %87.91
|-
|align="left" colspan=10|Ref.: YSK
|}

Başakşehir

|- style="background-color:#F2F2F2"
| align="center" colspan="3" | Voters
| align="center" colspan="7" | Ballot boxes
|- align="left"
| align="center" colspan="3" | 212,289
| align="center" colspan="7" | 682
|-
|- style="background-color:#E9E9E9"
|-
! align="center" colspan="4" | Candidates
! align="center" colspan="6" | Results
|- style="background-color:#E9E9E9"
! align="center" colspan="2"| Abb.
! align="center" | Party
! align="center" | Nominee
! align="center" | Vote
! align="center" | Per.
|- align="left"
|bgcolor="#ED8000" width=1|
| AKP
| Justice and Development Party
| Mevlüt Uysal
| 92.495
| %50.1
|- align="left"
|bgcolor="#DA251C" width=1|
| CHP
|Republican People's Party
|Özgür Karabat
| 62.493
| %33.8
|- align="left"
|bgcolor="#91007B" width=1|
| HDP
| Peoples' Democratic Party
| Şemsettin Arslan
|  13.165
|  %7.14
|- align="left"
|bgcolor="#D20001" width=1|
| MHP
| Nationalist Movement Party
|  Muharrem Kaya
|7.827
| %4.24
|- align="left"
|bgcolor="#D02433" width=1|
| SP
| Felicity Party
| Neşet Çevik 
| 5.981  
| %3.24
|- align="left"
|bgcolor="#ED1C24" width=1|
| BBP
| Great Union Party
|  Mehmet Emin Demirbağ
|   1.180
| %0.64
|- align="left"
|bgcolor="#FE0000" width=1|
| BTP
| Independent Turkey Party
| Ali Cengiz Taygan
| 420
| %0.22
|- align="left"
|bgcolor="#008DD2" width=1|
| YP
| Homeland Party
| Hakan Topel
| 246
| %0.13
|- align="left"
|bgcolor="#BB0000" width=1|
| İP
| Workers’ Party
| Avni Bavaş
|  176
| %0.09
|- align="left"
|bgcolor="#9D1D1E" width=1|
| DP
| Democratic Party
| Ahmed Serdaroğlu
| 136
| %0.07
|- align="left"
|bgcolor="#01A7E1" width=1|
| DSP
| Democratic Left Party
| Ayhan Taşkın
|  90
| %0.04
|- align="left"
|bgcolor="#0C63CA" width=1|
| MP
| Nation Party
| Azimet Yalçın 
|   78
| %0.04
|- align="left"
|bgcolor="#0C4DA2" width=1|
| LDP
| Liberal Democratic Party
| Nihal Şahin Yaman
| 41
| %0.02
|- align="left"
|bgcolor="#FBC817" width=1|
| TURK-P
| Social Reconciliation Reform and Development Party
| Bülent Binici
| 40
| %0.04
|- style="background-color:#E9E9E9" align="left"
! align="center" colspan="4" | Total
|align="center" colspan="5" |184.368
|- style="background-color:#E9E9E9" align="left"
! align="center" colspan="4" | Invalid votes
| align="center" colspan="5" |  7.956
|- style="background-color:#E9E9E9" align="left"
! align="center" colspan="4" | Turnout
| align="center" colspan="5" |  %90.60
|-
|align="left" colspan=10|Ref.: YSK
|}

Bayrampaşa

|- style="background-color:#F2F2F2"
| align="center" colspan="3" | Voters
| align="center" colspan="7" | Ballot boxes
|- align="left"
| align="center" colspan="3" | 197,412
| align="center" colspan="7" | 633
|-
|- style="background-color:#E9E9E9"
|-
! align="center" colspan="4" | Candidates
! align="center" colspan="6" | Results
|- style="background-color:#E9E9E9"
! align="center" colspan="2"|Abb.
! align="center" | Party
! align="center" | Nominee
! align="center" | Vote
! align="center" | Per.
|- align="left"
|bgcolor="#ED8000" width=1|
| AKP
| Justice and Development Party
| Atila Aydıner
| 86.571
| %50.3
|- align="left"
|bgcolor="#DA251C" width=1|
| CHP
|Republican People's Party
|Bahri Sipahi
| 67.750
| %39.4
|- align="left"
|bgcolor="#D20001" width=1|
| MHP
| Nationalist Movement Party
| Mehmet Mert Toker
|   7.318  
| %4.25
|- align="left"
|bgcolor="#D02433" width=1|
| SP
| Felicity Party
| İsmail Acar
| 4.528
| %2.63
|- align="left"
|bgcolor="#91007B" width=1|
| HDP
| Peoples' Democratic Party
| Erdal Oflaz
| 3.006
| %1.74
|- align="left"
|bgcolor="#ED1C24" width=1|
| BBP
| Great Union Party
| Fuat Küçük 
| 871
| %0.50
|- align="left"
|bgcolor="#008DD2" width=1|
| YP
| Homeland Party
|  Murat Melih Yılmaz
| 554
| %0.32
|- align="left"
|bgcolor="#000000" width=1|
| HEPAR
| Rights and Equality Party
|  Sefa Özgüneysu
| 276
| %0.16
|- align="left"
|bgcolor="#BB0000" width=1|
| İP
| Workers’ Party
| Serpil Akıllı
| 229
| %0.13
|- align="left"
|bgcolor="#01A7E1" width=1|
| DSP
| Democratic Left Party
| Suat Bahçekapılı
|  206
| %0.11
|- align="left"
|bgcolor="#FE0000" width=1|
| BTP
| Independent Turkey Party
| Mithat Kandemir
| 179
| %0.10
|- align="left"
|bgcolor="#9D1D1E" width=1|
| DP
| Democratic Party
| Ali Rıza Tunay
|177 
| %0.10
|- align="left"
|bgcolor="#0C63CA" width=1|
| MP
| Nation Party
| Etem Kuri
| 57  
| %0.03
|- align="left"
|bgcolor="#FBC817" width=1|
| TURK-P
| Social Reconciliation Reform and Development Party
| Şahin Erbay
| 48
| %0.02
|- align="left"
|bgcolor="#0C4DA2" width=1|
| LDP
| Liberal Democratic Party
| Muhammet Karaoğlu
| 28
| %0.01
|- align="left"
|bgcolor=" " width=1|
| BĞMSZ
| Independent
| Ahmet Gülümser
|20
| %0.01
|- style="background-color:#E9E9E9" align="left"
! align="center" colspan="4" | Total
|align="center" colspan="5" |171.818
|- style="background-color:#E9E9E9" align="left"
! align="center" colspan="4" | Invalid votes
| align="center" colspan="5" |  6.733
|- style="background-color:#E9E9E9" align="left"
! align="center" colspan="4" | Turnout
| align="center" colspan="5" |  %90.45
|-
|align="left" colspan=10|Ref.: YSK
|}

Beşiktaş

|- style="background-color:#F2F2F2"
| align="center" colspan="3" | Voters
| align="center" colspan="7" | Ballot boxes
|- align="left"
| align="center" colspan="3" | 148,221
| align="center" colspan="7" | 480
|-
|- style="background-color:#E9E9E9"
|-
! align="center" colspan="4" | Candidates
! align="center" colspan="6" | Results
|- style="background-color:#E9E9E9"
! align="center" colspan="2"|Abb.
! align="center" | Party
! align="center" | Nominee
! align="center" | Vote
! align="center" | Per.
|- align="left"
|bgcolor="#DA251C" width=1|
| CHP
| Republican People's Party
| Murat Hazinedar
| 97.497
| %76.2
|- align="left"
|bgcolor="#ED8000" width=1|
| AKP
|  Justice and Development Party
| Zeynel Abidin Okul
| 21.179
| %16.5
|- align="left"
|bgcolor="#D20001" width=1|
| MHP
| Nationalist Movement Party
| Burhan Akdağ
| 3.877    
| %3.03
|- align="left"
|bgcolor="#91007B" width=1|
| HDP
| Peoples' Democratic Party
| Ahmet Saymadi
| 2.125 
| %1.66
|- align="left"
|bgcolor="#01A7E1" width=1|
| DSP
| Democratic Left Party
| Mustafa Can Ataklı
| 1.253
| %0.98
|- align="left"
|bgcolor="#D02433" width=1|
| SP
| Felicity Party
| Murat Kutlu Sezen
| 520
| %0.40
|- align="left"
|bgcolor="#BB0000" width=1|
| İP
| Workers’ Party
| Füsün İkikardeş
| 517
| %0.40
|- align="left"
|bgcolor="#ED1C24" width=1|
| BBP
| Great Union Party
|  Muhammet Umut Dövletoğulları
| 279
| %0.21
|- align="left"
|bgcolor="#000000" width=1|
| HEPAR
| Rights and Equality Party
|  Enver Alper Mutluer
| 183
| %0.14   
|- align="left"
|bgcolor="#9D1D1E" width=1|
| DP
| Democratic Party
| Muhsin Şener Kıralı
| 143
| %0.11
|- align="left"
|bgcolor="#0C63CA" width=1|
| YP
| Homeland Party
| Muzaffer Melih Konak 
| 103
| %0.08
|- align="left"
|bgcolor="#0C4DA2" width=1|
| LDP
| Liberal Democratic Party
| Kaan Alper 
| 57
| %0.04
|- align="left"
|bgcolor="#FE0000" width=1|
| BTP
| Independent Turkey Party
| Hasan Hüseyin Savukduran
| 52
| %0.04
|- align="left"
|bgcolor="#0C63CA" width=1|
| MP
| Nation Party
| Bülent Yılmaz 
|  19 
| %0.01
|- style="background-color:#E9E9E9" align="left"
! align="center" colspan="4" | Total
|align="center" colspan="5" |127.804
|- style="background-color:#E9E9E9" align="left"
! align="center" colspan="4" | Invalid votes
| align="center" colspan="5" |  3.306
|- style="background-color:#E9E9E9" align="left"
! align="center" colspan="4" | Turnout
| align="center" colspan="5" |  %88.46
|-
|align="left" colspan=10|Ref.: YSK
|}

Beykoz

|- style="background-color:#F2F2F2"
| align="center" colspan="3" | Voters
| align="center" colspan="7" | Ballot boxes
|- align="left"
| align="center" colspan="3" | 181,749
| align="center" colspan="7" | 597
|-
|- style="background-color:#E9E9E9"
|-
! align="center" colspan="4" | Candidates
! align="center" colspan="6" | Results
|- style="background-color:#E9E9E9"
! align="center" colspan="2"|Abb.
! align="center" | Party
! align="center" | Nominee
! align="center" | Vote
! align="center" | Per.
|- align="left"
|bgcolor="#ED8000" width=1|
| AKP
| Justice and Development Party
| Yücel Çelikbilek
| 69.757
| %44.6
|- align="left"
|bgcolor="#DA251C" width=1|
| CHP
|Republican People's Party
|Hızır Yılmaz
| 51.234
| %32.7
|- align="left"
|bgcolor="#D20001" width=1|
| MHP
| Nationalist Movement Party
|  Alaattin Köseler
|15.286
| %9.77
|- align="left"
|bgcolor="#ED1C24" width=1|
| BBP
| Great Union Party
|  Bilgehan Murat Miniç
| 10.508
| %6.72
|- align="left"
|bgcolor="#D02433" width=1|
| SP
| Felicity Party
| Selman Yücel
| 4.121  
| %2.63
|- align="left"
|bgcolor="#91007B" width=1|
| HDP
| Peoples' Democratic Party
| Neriman Birgül Hakan
| 2.761  
| %1.76
|- align="left"
|bgcolor="#0C63CA" width=1|
| MP
| Nation Party
| Mehmet Ali Anafarta
| 841
| %0.53
|- align="left"
|bgcolor="#9D1D1E" width=1|
| DP
| Democratic Party
| Ali Bülent Varol
| 443
| %0.28
|- align="left"
|bgcolor="#01A7E1" width=1|
| DSP
| Democratic Left Party
| Recayi Çelik
| 376
| %0.24
|- align="left"
|bgcolor="#000000" width=1|
| HEPAR
| Rights and Equality Party
|  Nevzat Çetin
| 341
| %0.21
|- align="left"
|bgcolor="#BB0000" width=1|
| İP
| Workers’ Party
| Can Çakmak
| 299
| %0.19
|- align="left"
|bgcolor="#FE0000" width=1|
| BTP
| Independent Turkey Party
| Ramazan Mehmet Berber 
|231 
| %0.14
|- align="left"
|bgcolor=" " width=1|
| BĞMSZ
| Independent
| Kubulay Tekin
| 44
| %0.02
|- align="left"
|bgcolor="#0C4DA2" width=1|
| LDP
| Liberal Democratic Party
| Fatma Sibel Lilioğlu
| 33
| %0.02
|- align="left"
|bgcolor=" " width=1|
| BĞMSZ
| Independent
| Hamit Olgun Coşkuntuna
| 33
| %0.02
|- align="left"
|bgcolor=" " width=1|
| BĞMSZ
| Independent
| Murat Eken
| 30
| %0.01
|- style="background-color:#E9E9E9" align="left"
! align="center" colspan="4" | Total
|align="center" colspan="5" |156.338 
|- style="background-color:#E9E9E9" align="left"
! align="center" colspan="4" | Invalid votes
| align="center" colspan="5" | 8.647 
|- style="background-color:#E9E9E9" align="left"
! align="center" colspan="4" | Turnout
| align="center" colspan="5" | %90.78 
|-
|align="left" colspan=10|Ref.: YSK
|}

Beylikdüzü

|- style="background-color:#F2F2F2"
| align="center" colspan="3" | Voters
| align="center" colspan="7" | Ballot boxes
|- align="left"
| align="center" colspan="3" | 172,949
| align="center" colspan="7" | 552
|-
|- style="background-color:#E9E9E9"
|-
! align="center" colspan="4" | Candidates
! align="center" colspan="6" | Results
|- style="background-color:#E9E9E9"
! align="center" colspan="2"|Abb.
! align="center" | Party
! align="center" | Nominee
! align="center" | Vote
! align="center" | Per.
|- align="left"
|bgcolor="#DA251C" width=1|
| CHP
| Republican People's Party
| Ekrem İmamoğlu
| 76.034
| %50.8
|- align="left"
|bgcolor="#ED8000" width=1|
| AKP
|  Justice and Development Party
| Yusuf Uzun
| 59.309
| %39.6
|- align="left"
|bgcolor="#D20001" width=1|
| MHP
| Nationalist Movement Party
|  Ethem Baykal
|  6.971   
| %4.66
|- align="left"
|bgcolor="#91007B" width=1|
| HDP
| Peoples' Democratic Party
| Celal Işık
| 3.981 
| %2.66     
|- align="left"
|bgcolor="#D02433" width=1|
| SP
| Felicity Party
| Mustafa Hasan Öz
| 1.191  
| %0.79
|- align="left"
|bgcolor="#ED1C24" width=1|
| BBP
| Great Union Party
|  Volkan Berber
| 886
| %0.59
|- align="left"
|bgcolor="#BB0000" width=1|
| İP
| Workers’ Party
| Coşkun Ege
| 317
| %0.21
|- align="left"
|bgcolor="#000000" width=1|
| HEPAR
| Rights and Equality Party
|  Serdar Şıdım
| 283
| %0.18
|- align="left"
|bgcolor="#9D1D1E" width=1|
| DP
| Democratic Party
| Ali Savut
| 283
| %0.18
|- align="left"
|bgcolor="#FE0000" width=1|
| BTP
| Independent Turkey Party
| Emine Namlı
| 162
| %0.10
|- align="left"
|bgcolor="#01A7E1" width=1|
| DSP
| Democratic Left Party
| Atilla Kubilay Canbaz
| 73
| %0.04
|- align="left"
|bgcolor=" " width=1|
| BĞMSZ
| Independent
| Murat Kızgın
| 43
| %0.02
|- align="left"
|bgcolor="#0C63CA" width=1|
| MP
| Nation Party
| Ayten Görüşük
| 35
| %0.02
|- align="left"
|bgcolor="#0C4DA2" width=1|
| LDP
| Liberal Democratic Party
| İlker Özdel
| 22
| %0.01
|- style="background-color:#E9E9E9" align="left"
! align="center" colspan="4" | Total
|align="center" colspan="5" |149.590
|- style="background-color:#E9E9E9" align="left"
! align="center" colspan="4" | Invalid votes
| align="center" colspan="5" | 6.151 
|- style="background-color:#E9E9E9" align="left"
! align="center" colspan="4" | Turnout
| align="center" colspan="5" | %90.05
|-
|align="left" colspan=10|Ref.: YSK
|}

Beyoğlu

|- style="background-color:#F2F2F2"
| align="center" colspan="3" | Voters
| align="center" colspan="7" | Ballot boxes
|- align="left"
| align="center" colspan="3" | 176,186
| align="center" colspan="7" | 574
|-
|- style="background-color:#E9E9E9"
|-
! align="center" colspan="4" | Candidates
! align="center" colspan="6" | Results
|- style="background-color:#E9E9E9"
! align="center" colspan="2"|Abb.
! align="center" | Party
! align="center" | Nominee
! align="center" | Vote
! align="center" | Per.
|- align="left"
|bgcolor="#ED8000" width=1|
| AKP
| Justice and Development Party
| Ahmet Misbah Demircan
| 69.549
| %47.8 
|- align="left"
|bgcolor="#DA251C" width=1|
| CHP
|Republican People's Party
|Aylin Kotil Yıldırımer 
| 51.184
| %35.1
|- align="left"
|bgcolor="#91007B" width=1|
| HDP
| Peoples' Democratic Party
| Seyhan Alma
| 10.590 
| %7.28     
|- align="left"
|bgcolor="#D20001" width=1|
| MHP
| Nationalist Movement Party
| Osman Gür
|7.105
| %4.88
|- align="left"
|bgcolor="#D02433" width=1|
| SP
| Felicity Party
| Mustafa Kaya
| 4.691   
|  %3.22
|- align="left"
|bgcolor="#ED1C24" width=1|
| BBP
| Great Union Party
|  Fevzi Çoşkun
| 710  
| %0.48
|- align="left"
|bgcolor="#BB0000" width=1|
| İP
| Workers’ Party
| Merdan Aslan
| 354
| %0.24
|- align="left"
|bgcolor="#0C63CA" width=1|
| YP
| Homeland Party
| Gökhan Aydoğdu
| 264
| %0.18
|- align="left"
|bgcolor="#000000" width=1|
| HEPAR
| Rights and Equality Party
|  Mihriye Nevra Ölçer
| 257
| %0.17
|- align="left"
|bgcolor="#FE0000" width=1|
| BTP
| Independent Turkey Party
| Ertuğrul Hekimoğlu
| 231
| %0.15
|- align="left"
|bgcolor="#01A7E1" width=1|
| DSP
| Democratic Left Party
| Gürsel Durmaz
| 203
| %0.13
|- align="left"
|bgcolor="#9D1D1E" width=1|
| DP
| Democratic Party
| Çetin Üstaş
| 137
| %0.09
|- align="left"
|bgcolor="#0C63CA" width=1|
| MP
| Nation Party
| Özcan Yay
|  55  
| %0.03
|- align="left"
|bgcolor="#0C4DA2" width=1|
| LDP
| Liberal Democratic Party
| Volkan Gökdemir
|42 
| %0.02
|- align="left"
|bgcolor=" " width=1|
| BĞMSZ
| Independent
| Osman Ertürk
| 27
| %0.01
|- align="left"
|bgcolor=" " width=1|
| BĞMSZ
| Independent
| Sinan Baytekin
| 21
| %0.01
|- align="left"
|bgcolor=" " width=1|
| BĞMSZ
| Independent
| Yılmaz Demirkıran
| 15
| %0.01
|- style="background-color:#E9E9E9" align="left"
! align="center" colspan="4" | Total
|align="center" colspan="5" |145.435
|- style="background-color:#E9E9E9" align="left"
! align="center" colspan="4" | Invalid votes
| align="center" colspan="5" | 7.811 
|- style="background-color:#E9E9E9" align="left"
! align="center" colspan="4" | Turnout
| align="center" colspan="5" |  %86.98
|-
|align="left" colspan=10|Ref.: YSK
|}

Büyükçekmece

|- style="background-color:#F2F2F2"
| align="center" colspan="3" | Voters
| align="center" colspan="7" | Ballot boxes
|- align="left"
| align="center" colspan="3" | 149,671
| align="center" colspan="7" | 485
|-
|- style="background-color:#E9E9E9"
|-
! align="center" colspan="4" | Candidates
! align="center" colspan="6" | Results
|- style="background-color:#E9E9E9"
! align="center" colspan="2"|Abb.
! align="center" | Party
! align="center" | Nominee
! align="center" | Vote
! align="center" | Per.
|- align="left"
|bgcolor="#DA251C" width=1|
| CHP
| Republican People's Party
| Hasan Akgün
| 60.470
| %47.5
|- align="left"
|bgcolor="#ED8000" width=1|
| AKP
|  Justice and Development Party
| Celal Babayiğit
| 57.026
| %44.8
|- align="left"
|bgcolor="#D20001" width=1|
| MHP
| Nationalist Movement Party
| Yaşar Derin
|4.684
| %3.68
|- align="left"
|bgcolor="#91007B" width=1|
| HDP
| Peoples' Democratic Party
| Tevfik Baraner
| 2.550 
| %2.00
|- align="left"
|bgcolor="#D02433" width=1|
| SP
| Felicity Party
| Mahmut Ustahaliloğlu
| 634
|  %0.49
|- align="left"
|bgcolor="#ED1C24" width=1|
| BBP
| Great Union Party
|  Uğur Özer
|  606
| %0.47
|- align="left"
|bgcolor="#000000" width=1|
| HEPAR
| Rights and Equality Party
|  Birgen Şıdım
|  373 
| %0.29
|- align="left"
|bgcolor="#9D1D1E" width=1|
| DP
| Democratic Party
| Ersin Gürbüz
| 310
| %0.24
|- align="left"
|bgcolor="#BB0000" width=1|
| İP
| Workers’ Party
| Seda Önder
| 201
| %0.15
|- align="left"
|bgcolor="#FE0000" width=1|
| BTP
| Independent Turkey Party
| İlhan Şahin
| 114

| %0.08
|- align="left"
|bgcolor="#01A7E1" width=1|
| DSP
| Democratic Left Party
| Erdoğan Hatiboğlu
|99 
| %0.07
|- align="left"
|bgcolor="#0C4DA2" width=1|
| LDP
| Liberal Democratic Party
| İskender Gürkaya
| 26
| %0.02
|- align="left"
|bgcolor="#0C63CA" width=1|
| MP
| Nation Party
| Hasan Bucak
| 20  
| %0.01
|- align="left"
|bgcolor=" " width=1|
| BĞMSZ
| Independent
| Kamil Ata
| 14
| %0.01
|- style="background-color:#E9E9E9" align="left"
! align="center" colspan="4" | Total
|align="center" colspan="5" |127.127
|- style="background-color:#E9E9E9" align="left"
! align="center" colspan="4" | Invalid votes
| align="center" colspan="5" |  6.003
|- style="background-color:#E9E9E9" align="left"
! align="center" colspan="4" | Turnout
| align="center" colspan="5" | %88.95 
|-
|align="left" colspan=10|Ref.: YSK
|}

Çatalca

|- style="background-color:#F2F2F2"
| align="center" colspan="3" | Voters
| align="center" colspan="7" | Ballot boxes
|- align="left"
| align="center" colspan="3" | 49,879
| align="center" colspan="7" | 177
|-
|- style="background-color:#E9E9E9"
|-
! align="center" colspan="4" | Candidates
! align="center" colspan="6" | Results
|- style="background-color:#E9E9E9"
! align="center" colspan="2"|Abb.
! align="center" | Party
! align="center" | Nominee
! align="center" | Vote
! align="center" | Per.
|- align="left"
|bgcolor="#DA251C" width=1|
| CHP
| Republican People's Party
| Cem Kara
| 19.529
| %44.5
|- align="left"
|bgcolor="#ED8000" width=1|
| AKP
|  Justice and Development Party
| Savaş Barutçu
| 15.672
| %35.7
|- align="left"
|bgcolor="#D20001" width=1|
| MHP
| Nationalist Movement Party
|  İsmail İp
|7.437
| %16.9
|- align="left"
|bgcolor="#91007B" width=1|
| HDP
| Peoples' Democratic Party
| Serpil Kemalbay Pekgözegü
| 425

| %0.96
|- align="left"
|bgcolor="#D02433" width=1|
| SP
| Felicity Party
| Serdar Taşar
| 288  
| %0.65
|- align="left"
|bgcolor="#BB0000" width=1|
| İP
| Workers’ Party
| İsmail Çirci
|177

| %0.40
|- align="left"
|bgcolor="#9D1D1E" width=1|
| DP
| Democratic Party
| Bilge Eşmeli
| 116
| %0.26
|- align="left"
|bgcolor="#ED1C24" width=1|
| BBP
| Great Union Party
|  Ali Çelebican
| 71
| %0.16
|- align="left"
|bgcolor="#FE0000" width=1|
| BTP
| Independent Turkey Party
| Recep Cevat Yıldır 
| 51
| %0.11
|- align="left"
|bgcolor="#01A7E1" width=1|
| DSP
| Democratic Left Party
| Bayram İğdeli
| 35
| %0.07
|- align="left"
|bgcolor="#0C4DA2" width=1|
| LDP
| Liberal Democratic Party
| Cem Açabuğa
|22 
| %0.05
|- align="left"
|bgcolor=" " width=1|
| BĞMSZ
| Independent
| Ahmet Arslan
| 17
| %0.03
|- style="background-color:#E9E9E9" align="left"
! align="center" colspan="4" | Total
|align="center" colspan="5" |43.840 
|- style="background-color:#E9E9E9" align="left"
! align="center" colspan="4" | Invalid votes
| align="center" colspan="5" |  2.519
|- style="background-color:#E9E9E9" align="left"
! align="center" colspan="4" | Turnout
| align="center" colspan="5" | %92.94 
|-
|align="left" colspan=10|Ref.: YSK
|}

Çekmeköy

|- style="background-color:#F2F2F2"
| align="center" colspan="3" | Voters
| align="center" colspan="7" | Ballot boxes
|- align="left"
| align="center" colspan="3" | 140,253
| align="center" colspan="7" | 453
|-
|- style="background-color:#E9E9E9"
|-
! align="center" colspan="4" | Candidates
! align="center" colspan="6" | Results
|- style="background-color:#E9E9E9"
! align="center" colspan="2"|Abb.
! align="center" | Party
! align="center" | Nominee
! align="center" | Vote
! align="center" | Per.
|- align="left"
|bgcolor="#ED8000" width=1|
| AKP
| Justice and Development Party
| Ahmet Poyraz
| 59.302
| %48.6
|- align="left"
|bgcolor="#DA251C" width=1|
| CHP
|Republican People's Party
|Seyfettin Yıldırım
| 46.709
| %38.3
|- align="left"
|bgcolor="#D20001" width=1|
| MHP
| Nationalist Movement Party
| Doğan Öztürk Balcı
|6.544
| %5.37
|- align="left"
|bgcolor="#91007B" width=1|
| HDP
| Peoples' Democratic Party
| Azat Altun
| 4.720 
| %3.87
|- align="left"
|bgcolor="#D02433" width=1|
| SP
| Felicity Party
| Adem Boz
| 2.516
| %2.06
|- align="left"
|bgcolor="#ED1C24" width=1|
| BBP
| Great Union Party
|  Hasan Koç
|  1.383
| %1.13
|- align="left"
|bgcolor="#9D1D1E" width=1|
| DP
| Democratic Party
| Hamit Çelik
| 259
| %0.21
|- align="left"
|bgcolor="#FE0000" width=1|
| BTP
| Independent Turkey Party
| Abdulmuttalip Örpek
| 168

| %0.14
|- align="left"
|bgcolor="#BB0000" width=1|
| İP
| Workers’ Party
| Murat Parlak
| 145
| %0.12
|- align="left"
|bgcolor="#01A7E1" width=1|
| DSP
| Democratic Left Party
| Perihan Urşan
| 68
| %0.06
|- align="left"
|bgcolor="#DA251C" width=1|
| DYP
| True Path Party
|Doğan Sönmez
|42
| %0.03
|- align="left"
|bgcolor=" " width=1|
| BĞMSZ
| Independent
| İsmail İsmailoğlu
| 36
| %0.02
|- align="left"
|bgcolor="#0C4DA2" width=1|
| LDP
| Liberal Democratic Party
| Ahmet Emin Şık
| 27
| %0.02
|- style="background-color:#E9E9E9" align="left"
! align="center" colspan="4" | Total
|align="center" colspan="5" |121.919
|- style="background-color:#E9E9E9" align="left"
! align="center" colspan="4" | Invalid votes
| align="center" colspan="5" | 6.675 
|- style="background-color:#E9E9E9" align="left"
! align="center" colspan="4" | Turnout
| align="center" colspan="5" | %91.69 
|-
|align="left" colspan=10|Ref.: YSK
|}

Esenler

|- style="background-color:#F2F2F2"
| align="center" colspan="3" | Voters
| align="center" colspan="7" | Ballot boxes
|- align="left"
| align="center" colspan="3" | 306,183
| align="center" colspan="7" | 982
|-
|- style="background-color:#E9E9E9"
|-
! align="center" colspan="4" | Candidates
! align="center" colspan="6" | Results
|- style="background-color:#E9E9E9"
! align="center" colspan="2"|Abb.
! align="center" | Party
! align="center" | Nominee
! align="center" | Vote
! align="center" | Per.
|- align="left"
|bgcolor="#ED8000" width=1|
| AKP
| Justice and Development Party
| Mehmet Tevfik Göksu
| 162.889
| %62.3
|- align="left"
|bgcolor="#DA251C" width=1|
| CHP
|Republican People's Party
|Mahmut Aksal Örüklü 
| 39.191
| %14.9
|- align="left"
|bgcolor="#D02433" width=1|
| SP
| Felicity Party
| Erol Urhan
| 19.805
| %7.58
|- align="left"
|bgcolor="#D20001" width=1|
| MHP
| Nationalist Movement Party
| Ahmet Fidan
|17.613
| %6.74
|- align="left"
|bgcolor="#91007B" width=1|
| HDP
| Peoples' Democratic Party
| Nuriye Avşar
|  17.024

| %6.51
|- align="left"
|bgcolor="#ED1C24" width=1|
| BBP
| Great Union Party
|  Erol Hacigül
| 2.213
| %0.85
|- align="left"
|bgcolor="#008DD2" width=1|
| YP
| Homeland Party
| Meral Gürdal
| 657
| %0.25
|- align="left"
|bgcolor="#FE0000" width=1|
| BTP
| Independent Turkey Party
| Altan Kalemci
| 586
| %0.22
|- align="left"
|bgcolor="#BB0000" width=1|
| İP
| Workers’ Party
| Oktay Şahin
| 332
| %0.13
|- align="left"
|bgcolor="#9D1D1E" width=1|
| DP
| Democratic Party
| İsa Şeker
| 313
| %0.12
|- align="left"
|bgcolor="#0C63CA" width=1|
| MP
| Nation Party
| Murat İstanbullu
| 196
| %0.07
|- align="left"
|bgcolor="#01A7E1" width=1|
| DSP
| Democratic Left Party
| Alaattin Bayram
| 195
| %0.07
|- align="left"
|bgcolor="#EFDF00" width=1|
| TURK-P
| Social Reconciliation Reform and Development Party
| Meliha Dörtkardeş
| 189  
| %0.07
|- align="left"
|bgcolor=" " width=1|
| BĞMSZ
| Independent
| Budak Yıldırım
| 104
| %0.04
|- align="left"
|bgcolor="#0C4DA2" width=1|
| LDP
| Liberal Democratic Party
| Kemal Aker
| 86
| %0.03
|- style="background-color:#E9E9E9" align="left"
! align="center" colspan="4" | Total
|align="center" colspan="5" |261.393
|- style="background-color:#E9E9E9" align="left"
! align="center" colspan="4" | Invalid votes
| align="center" colspan="5" |  13.391
|- style="background-color:#E9E9E9" align="left"
! align="center" colspan="4" | Turnout
| align="center" colspan="5" |%89.98  
|-
|align="left" colspan=10|Ref.: YSK
|}

Esenyurt

|- style="background-color:#F2F2F2"
| align="center" colspan="3" | Voters
| align="center" colspan="7" | Ballot boxes
|- align="left"
| align="center" colspan="3" | 411,720
| align="center" colspan="7" | 1313
|-
|- style="background-color:#E9E9E9"
|-
! align="center" colspan="4" | Candidates
! align="center" colspan="6" | Results
|- style="background-color:#E9E9E9"
! align="center" colspan="2"|Abb.
! align="center" | Party
! align="center" | Nominee
! align="center" | Vote
! align="center" | Per.
|- align="left"
|bgcolor="#ED8000" width=1|
| AKP
| Justice and Development Party
| Necmi Kadıoğlu
| 161.698
| %47.0
|- align="left"
|bgcolor="#DA251C" width=1|
| CHP
|Republican People's Party
|Çetin Çapan
| 119.539
| %34.7
|- align="left"
|bgcolor="#91007B" width=1|
| HDP
| Peoples' Democratic Party
| Cüneyt Caniş
|  34.066
| %9.90
|- align="left"
|bgcolor="#D20001" width=1|
| MHP
| Nationalist Movement Party
| Halit Özer
| 20.393     
| %5.93
|- align="left"
|bgcolor="#D02433" width=1|
| SP
| Felicity Party
| Abdullah İlkadlı
| 3.299
| %0.96
|- align="left"
|bgcolor="#ED1C24" width=1|
| BBP
| Great Union Party
| Muammer Budak 
| 1.702
| %0.49
|- align="left"
|bgcolor="#FE0000" width=1|
| BTP
| Independent Turkey Party
| Ali Akgül
| 1.160
| %0.34
|- align="left"
|bgcolor="#9D1D1E" width=1|
| DP
| Democratic Party
| Cesur Çiftçi
| 795
| %0.23
|- align="left"
|bgcolor="#BB0000" width=1|
| İP
| Workers’ Party
| Zihni Selvi
| 558
| %0.16
|- align="left"
|bgcolor="#01A7E1" width=1|
| DSP
| Democratic Left Party
| İbrahim Özdemir
| 311
| %0.09
|- align="left"
|bgcolor="#DA251C" width=1|
| DYP
| True Path Party
|Emrullah Güneş
| 163
| %0.05
|- align="left"
|bgcolor="#0C63CA" width=1|
| MP
| Nation Party
| Metin Bucak
| 149
| %0.04
|- align="left"
|bgcolor="#0C4DA2" width=1|
| LDP
| Liberal Democratic Party
| Fazlı Soymaz
| 102
| %0.03
|- align="left"
|bgcolor=" " width=1|
| BĞMSZ
| Independent
| Engin Emrah Biçer
| 72
| %0.02
|- style="background-color:#E9E9E9" align="left"
! align="center" colspan="4" | Total
|align="center" colspan="5" |344.007
|- style="background-color:#E9E9E9" align="left"
! align="center" colspan="4" | Invalid votes
| align="center" colspan="5" |  19.263
|- style="background-color:#E9E9E9" align="left"
! align="center" colspan="4" | Turnout
| align="center" colspan="5" |  %88.23
|-
|align="left" colspan=10|Ref.: YSK
|}

Eyüp

|- style="background-color:#F2F2F2"
| align="center" colspan="3" | Voters
| align="center" colspan="7" | Ballot boxes
|- align="left"
| align="center" colspan="3" | 258,837
| align="center" colspan="7" | 838
|-
|- style="background-color:#E9E9E9"
|-
! align="center" colspan="4" | Candidates
! align="center" colspan="6" | Results
|- style="background-color:#E9E9E9"
! align="center" colspan="2"|Abb.
! align="center" | Party
! align="center" | Nominee
! align="center" | Vote
! align="center" | Per.
|- align="left"
|bgcolor="#ED8000" width=1|
| AKP
| Justice and Development Party
| Remzi Aydın
| 104.303
| %46.6 
|- align="left"
|bgcolor="#DA251C" width=1|
| CHP
|Republican People's Party
|Ferzan Özer
| 89.667
| %40.1
|- align="left"
|bgcolor="#D20001" width=1|
| MHP
| Nationalist Movement Party
| Kamil Yıldız
|13.194
| %5.90
|- align="left"
|bgcolor="#D02433" width=1|
| SP
| Felicity Party
| Celal Çoban 
|  7.570 
| %3.39
|- align="left"
|bgcolor="#91007B" width=1|
| HDP
| Peoples' Democratic Party
| Asya Ülker
|  5.739
| %2.57
|- align="left"
|bgcolor="#ED1C24" width=1|
| BBP
| Great Union Party
|  Mustafa Tali
| 1.052
| %0.47
|- align="left"
|bgcolor="#000000" width=1|
| HEPAR
| Rights and Equality Party
| Pınar Çuhalı 
|  417 
| %0.19
|- align="left"
|bgcolor="#01A7E1" width=1|
| DSP
| Democratic Left Party
| Faik Kaya
| 367
| %0.16
|- align="left"
|bgcolor="#0C63CA" width=1|
| YP
| Homeland Party
| Mustafa Bayburt
| 309
| %0.14
|- align="left"
|bgcolor="#FE0000" width=1|
| BTP
| Independent Turkey Party
| Bayram Özdemir
| 288
| %0.13
|- align="left"
|bgcolor="#BB0000" width=1|
| İP
| Workers’ Party
| Musa Artur Önemci
| 248
| %0.11
|- align="left"
|bgcolor="#9D1D1E" width=1|
| DP
| Democratic Party
| Adnan Öztürk
| 199 
| %0.09
|- align="left"
|bgcolor="#0C63CA" width=1|
| MP
| Nation Party
| Saffet Geniş
| 86 
| %0.04
|- align="left"
|bgcolor="#0C4DA2" width=1|
| LDP
| Liberal Democratic Party
| Fetislam Özer
| 58
| %0.03
|- align="left"
|bgcolor="#FDFF32" width=1|
| TURK-P
| Social Reconciliation Reform and Development Party
| Gökmen Kılıç
| 49
| %0.02
|- style="background-color:#E9E9E9" align="left"
! align="center" colspan="4" | Total
|align="center" colspan="5" |223.546
|- style="background-color:#E9E9E9" align="left"
! align="center" colspan="4" | Invalid votes
| align="center" colspan="5" |  10.402
|- style="background-color:#E9E9E9" align="left"
! align="center" colspan="4" | Turnout
| align="center" colspan="5" |  %90.38
|-
|align="left" colspan=10|Ref.: YSK
|}

Fatih

|- style="background-color:#F2F2F2"
| align="center" colspan="3" | Voters
| align="center" colspan="7" | Ballot boxes
|- align="left"
| align="center" colspan="3" | 309,745
| align="center" colspan="7" | 1016
|-
|- style="background-color:#E9E9E9"
|-
! align="center" colspan="4" | Candidates
! align="center" colspan="6" | Results
|- style="background-color:#E9E9E9"
! align="center" colspan="2"|Abb.
! align="center" | Party
! align="center" | Nominee
! align="center" | Vote
! align="center" | Per.
|- align="left"
|bgcolor="#ED8000" width=1|
| AKP
| Justice and Development Party
| Mustafa Demir
| 122.656
| %48.6
|- align="left"
|bgcolor="#DA251C" width=1|
| CHP
|Republican People's Party
|Sabri Özkan Erbakan
| 79.624
| %31.5
|- align="left"
|bgcolor="#D20001" width=1|
| MHP
| Nationalist Movement Party
| Metin Örel
| 17.785   
| %7.05
|- align="left"
|bgcolor="#D02433" width=1|
| SP
| Felicity Party
| Lütfi Kibiroğlu
| 16.029
| %6.36
|- align="left"
|bgcolor="#91007B" width=1|
| HDP
| Peoples' Democratic Party
| Turhan Yıldırım
| 12.079
| %4.79
|- align="left"
|bgcolor="#ED1C24" width=1|
| BBP
| Great Union Party
|  Kemal Yücel
| 1.347
| %0.53
|- align="left"
|bgcolor="#BB0000" width=1|
| İP
| Workers’ Party
| Şevki Bilgin
| 599
| %0.24
|- align="left"
|bgcolor="#0C63CA" width=1|
| YP
| Homeland Party
| Ogün Kemal Turan
| 593
| %0.24
|- align="left"
|bgcolor="#FE0000" width=1|
| BTP
| Independent Turkey Party
| Mustafa Reşit Sofuoğlu
| 440
| %0.17
|- align="left"
|bgcolor="#01A7E1" width=1|
| DSP
| Democratic Left Party
| Erdoğan Tülümenler
| 257
| %0.10
|- align="left"
|bgcolor="#9D1D1E" width=1|
| DP
| Democratic Party
| İbrahim Haytaoğlu
| 246
| %0.10
|- align="left"
|bgcolor="#DA251C" width=1|
| DYP
| True Path Party
|Ömer Akkoyun
| 127
| %0.05
|- align="left"
|bgcolor="#0C63CA" width=1|
| MP
| Nation Party
| Mevlüt Koçoğlu
| 112
| %0.04
|- align="left"
|bgcolor="#FDFF32" width=1|
| TURK-P
| Social Reconciliation Reform and Development Party
| Erol Kılıç
| 93
| %0.04
|- align="left"
|bgcolor="#0C4DA2" width=1|
| LDP
| Liberal Democratic Party
| Selim Keskin
| 74
| %0.03
|- align="left"
|bgcolor=" " width=1|
| BĞMSZ
| Independent
| Yılmaz Geniş
| 60
| %0.02
|- style="background-color:#E9E9E9" align="left"
! align="center" colspan="4" | Total
|align="center" colspan="5" |252.121
|- style="background-color:#E9E9E9" align="left"
! align="center" colspan="4" | Invalid votes
| align="center" colspan="5" | 13.587 
|- style="background-color:#E9E9E9" align="left"
! align="center" colspan="4" | Turnout
| align="center" colspan="5" |  %85.78
|-
|align="left" colspan=10|Ref.: YSK
|}

Gaziosmanpaşa

|- style="background-color:#F2F2F2"
| align="center" colspan="3" | Voters
| align="center" colspan="7" | Ballot boxes
|- align="left"
| align="center" colspan="3" | 345,180
| align="center" colspan="7" | 1094
|-
|- style="background-color:#E9E9E9"
|-
! align="center" colspan="4" | Candidates
! align="center" colspan="6" | Results
|- style="background-color:#E9E9E9"
! align="center" colspan="2"|Abb.
! align="center" | Party
! align="center" | Nominee
! align="center" | Vote
! align="center" | Per.
|- align="left"
|bgcolor="#ED8000" width=1|
| AKP
| Justice and Development Party
| Hasan Tahsin Usta
| 150.706
| %51.3
|- align="left"
|bgcolor="#DA251C" width=1|
| CHP
|Republican People's Party
|Selahattin Meriç
| 73.861
| %25.1
|- align="left"
|bgcolor="#D02433" width=1|
| SP
| Felicity Party
| Bilal Ay
| 37.245   
| %12.6
|- align="left"
|bgcolor="#91007B" width=1|
| HDP
| Peoples' Democratic Party
| Erdal Çelik
| 14.385 
| %4.90
|- align="left"
|bgcolor="#D20001" width=1|
| MHP
| Nationalist Movement Party
| Mikail Aras
|12.437
| %4.24
|- align="left"
|bgcolor="#ED1C24" width=1|
| BBP
| Great Union Party
|  Fedai Karakol
| 1.268
| %0.43
|- align="left"
|bgcolor="#9D1D1E" width=1|
| DP
| Democratic Party
| Ferruh Şendur
| 1.037
| %0.35
|- align="left"
|bgcolor="#FE0000" width=1|
| BTP
| Independent Turkey Party
| Yaşar Teber
| 617
| %0.21
|- align="left"
|bgcolor="#BB0000" width=1|
| İP
| Workers’ Party
| Cem Çalışkan
| 583
| %0.20
|- align="left"
|bgcolor="#000000" width=1|
| HEPAR
| Rights and Equality Party
|  Ömür Atahan
|  549
| %0.19
|- align="left"
|bgcolor="#01A7E1" width=1|
| DSP
| Democratic Left Party
| Alaattin Korkmaz
| 484
| %0.16
|- align="left"
|bgcolor="#0C63CA" width=1|
| MP
| Nation Party
| Yurdal Altın
| 204
| %0.07
|- align="left"
|bgcolor="#0C4DA2" width=1|
| LDP
| Liberal Democratic Party
| Hakkı Kanbo
| 190
| %0.06
|- align="left"
|bgcolor=" " width=1|
| BĞMSZ
| Independent
| Eşref Altınoluk
| 85
| %0.02
|- style="background-color:#E9E9E9" align="left"
! align="center" colspan="4" | Total
|align="center" colspan="5" |293.651
|- style="background-color:#E9E9E9" align="left"
! align="center" colspan="4" | Invalid votes
| align="center" colspan="5" |  13.170
|- style="background-color:#E9E9E9" align="left"
! align="center" colspan="4" | Turnout
| align="center" colspan="5" |  %88.89
|-
|align="left" colspan=10|Ref.: YSK
|}

Güngören

|- style="background-color:#F2F2F2"
| align="center" colspan="3" | Voters
| align="center" colspan="7" | Ballot boxes
|- align="left"
| align="center" colspan="3" | 221,123
| align="center" colspan="7" | 705
|-
|- style="background-color:#E9E9E9"
|-
! align="center" colspan="4" | Candidates
! align="center" colspan="6" | Results
|- style="background-color:#E9E9E9"
! align="center" colspan="2"|Abb.
! align="center" | Party
! align="center" | Nominee
! align="center" | Vote
! align="center" | Per.
|- align="left"
|bgcolor="#ED8000" width=1|
| AKP
| Justice and Development Party
| Şakir Yücel Karaman
| 93.996
| %50.1
|- align="left"
|bgcolor="#DA251C" width=1|
| CHP
|Republican People's Party
|Ahmet Güzel
| 57.840
| %30.8
|- align="left"
|bgcolor="#D20001" width=1|
| MHP
| Nationalist Movement Party
| Recep Seymen
|12.646
| %6.75
|- align="left"
|bgcolor="#91007B" width=1|
| HDP
| Peoples' Democratic Party
| Mehmet Turp
|  10.759
| %5.75     
|- align="left"
|bgcolor="#D02433" width=1|
| SP
| Felicity Party
| Abdulkadir Çelebi
| 8.940
| %4.77
|- align="left"
|bgcolor="#ED1C24" width=1|
| BBP
| Great Union Party
|  Kenan Temel
| 1.388
| %0.74
|- align="left"
|bgcolor="#FE0000" width=1|
| BTP
| Independent Turkey Party
| Hasan Hitaloğlu
| 531
| %0.28
|- align="left"
|bgcolor="#9D1D1E" width=1|
| DP
| Democratic Party
| Cemal Bacakcı
| 410
| %0.22
|- align="left"
|bgcolor="#BB0000" width=1|
| İP
| Workers’ Party
| Ömer Korkmaz
| 320
| %0.17
|- align="left"
|bgcolor="#01A7E1" width=1|
| DSP
| Democratic Left Party
| Tekin Oruç
| 128
| %0.07
|- align="left"
|bgcolor="#0C63CA" width=1|
| MP
| Nation Party
| Hatice Koçak
| 108  
| %0.06
|- align="left"
|bgcolor="#0C4DA2" width=1|
| LDP
| Liberal Democratic Party
| Yalçın Erken
| 91
| %0.05
|- align="left"
|bgcolor=" " width=1|
| BĞMSZ
| Independent
| Orhan Çebi
| 85
| %0.05 
|- align="left"
|bgcolor=" " width=1|
| BĞMSZ
| Independent
| Murat İncekara
| 30
| %0.02
|- style="background-color:#E9E9E9" align="left"
! align="center" colspan="4" | Total
|align="center" colspan="5" |187.272
|- style="background-color:#E9E9E9" align="left"
! align="center" colspan="4" | Invalid votes
| align="center" colspan="5" |  8.260
|- style="background-color:#E9E9E9" align="left"
! align="center" colspan="4" | Turnout
| align="center" colspan="5" | %88.43 
|-
|align="left" colspan=10|Ref.: YSK
|}

Kadıköy

|- style="background-color:#F2F2F2"
| align="center" colspan="3" | Voters
| align="center" colspan="7" | Ballot boxes
|- align="left"
| align="center" colspan="3" | 415,907
| align="center" colspan="7" | 1337
|-
|- style="background-color:#E9E9E9"
|-
! align="center" colspan="4" | Candidates
! align="center" colspan="6" | Results
|- style="background-color:#E9E9E9"
! align="center" colspan="2"|Abb.
! align="center" | Party
! align="center" | Nominee
! align="center" | Vote
! align="center" | Per.
|- align="left"
|bgcolor="#DA251C" width=1|
| CHP
| Republican People's Party
| Aykurt Nuhoğlu
| 260.439
| %72.4
|- align="left"
|bgcolor="#ED8000" width=1|
| AKP
| Justice and Development Party
| Hurşit Yıldırım 
| 73.598
| %20.4
|- align="left"
|bgcolor="#D20001" width=1|
| MHP
| Nationalist Movement Party
| Levent Akçay
|    12.241  
| %3.41
|- align="left"
|bgcolor="#91007B" width=1|
| HDP
| Peoples' Democratic Party
| Mukaddes Çelik
|  6.398 
| %1.78      
|- align="left"
|bgcolor="#BB0000" width=1|
| İP
| Workers’ Party
| Suzan Aksoy
| 1.912
| %0.53
|- align="left"
|bgcolor="#D02433" width=1|
| SP
| Felicity Party
| Bekir Cesur
| 1.643
| %0.46
|- align="left"
|bgcolor="#ED1C24" width=1|
| BBP
| Great Union Party
|  Şenol Gedikli
| 1.086
| %0.30
|- align="left"
|bgcolor="#000000" width=1|
| HEPAR
| Rights and Equality Party
|  Halide Yurteri
| 693
| %0.19
|- align="left"
|bgcolor="#01A7E1" width=1|
| DSP
| Democratic Left Party
| Hakkı Çarpa
| 377
| %0.10
|- align="left"
|bgcolor="#0C63CA" width=1|
| YP
| Homeland Party
| Alper Çağılkan
| 273
| %0.08
|- align="left"
|bgcolor="#9D1D1E" width=1|
| DP
| Democratic Party
| Yavuz Nural
| 226
| %0.06
|- align="left"
|bgcolor="#DA251C" width=1|
| DYP
| True Path Party
|Pelin Bora
|188
| %0.05
|- align="left"
|bgcolor="#0C4DA2" width=1|
| LDP
| Liberal Democratic Party
| İsmail Güner
| 128
| %0.04
|- align="left"
|bgcolor="#FE0000" width=1|
| BTP
| Independent Turkey Party
| Taner Yılmaz
| 125
| %0.03
|- align="left"
|bgcolor="#0C63CA" width=1|
| MP
| Nation Party
| Nefise Demirezen
| 54
| %0.01
|- align="left"
|bgcolor=" " width=1|
| BĞMSZ
| Independent
| Fatih Şahinler
|  0
| %0.00
|- style="background-color:#E9E9E9" align="left"
! align="center" colspan="4" | Total
|align="center" colspan="5" |359.472
|- style="background-color:#E9E9E9" align="left"
! align="center" colspan="4" | Invalid votes
|  align="center" colspan="5" |10.019
|- style="background-color:#E9E9E9" align="left"
! align="center" colspan="4" | Turnout
| align="center" colspan="5" |  %88.84
|-
|align="left" colspan=10|Ref.: YSK
|}

Kağıthane

|- style="background-color:#F2F2F2"
| align="center" colspan="3" | Voters
| align="center" colspan="7" | Ballot boxes
|- align="left"
| align="center" colspan="3" | 306,598
| align="center" colspan="7" | 985
|-
|- style="background-color:#E9E9E9"
|-
! align="center" colspan="4" | Candidates
! align="center" colspan="6" | Results
|- style="background-color:#E9E9E9"
! align="center" colspan="2"|Abb.
! align="center" | Party
! align="center" | Nominee
! align="center" | Vote
! align="center" | Per.
|- align="left"
|bgcolor="#ED8000" width=1|
| AKP
| Justice and Development Party
| Fazlı Kılıç
| 131.545
| %50.9
|- align="left"
|bgcolor="#DA251C" width=1|
| CHP
|Republican People's Party
|Serdar Kurşun
| 77.363
| %29.9
|- align="left"
|bgcolor="#D20001" width=1|
| MHP
| Nationalist Movement Party
|  Ali Derindağ 
|  19.804    
| %7.67
|- align="left"
|bgcolor="#D02433" width=1|
| SP
| Felicity Party
| Zeynel Keskin
| 15.367
| %5.95
|- align="left"
|bgcolor="#91007B" width=1|
| HDP
| Peoples' Democratic Party
| Ayten Kaya
| 9.591
| %3.71      
|- align="left"
|bgcolor="#ED1C24" width=1|
| BBP
| Great Union Party
|  Adem Mamaç 
|  2.485
| %0.96
|- align="left"
|bgcolor="#9D1D1E" width=1|
| DP
| Democratic Party
| Aynur Koyunoğlu
| 484
| %0.19
|- align="left"
|bgcolor="#BB0000" width=1|
| İP
| Workers’ Party
| Zeynep Türesin Arasan
| 410
| %0.16
|- align="left"
|bgcolor="#FE0000" width=1|
| BTP
| Independent Turkey Party
| Yaşar Öten 
| 396
| %0.15
|- align="left"
|bgcolor="#01A7E1" width=1|
| DSP
| Democratic Left Party
| Hüsnü Bediroğlu
| 265
| %0.10
|- align="left"
|bgcolor="#0C63CA" width=1|
| MP
| Nation Party
| Mehmet Birol Kakı
| 135
| %0.05
|- align="left"
|bgcolor="#EFDF00" width=1|
| TURK-P
| Social Reconciliation Reform and Development Party
| Yadali Özgündüz
| 96
| %0.04
|- align="left"
|bgcolor="#DA251C" width=1|
| DYP
| True Path Party
|Demet Özgül
|81
| %0.03
|- align="left"
|bgcolor="#0C4DA2" width=1|
| LDP
| Liberal Democratic Party
| Süleyman Sedat Satal
| 73
| %0.03
|- align="left"
|bgcolor=" " width=1|
| BĞMSZ
| Independent
| Sebahattin Kara
|  55
| %0.02
|- align="left"
|bgcolor=" " width=1|
| BĞMSZ
| Independent
| Mustafa Çağlar Akgün
| 34
| %0.01
|- align="left"
|bgcolor=" " width=1|
| BĞMSZ
| Independent
| Alpaslan Şenköylü
| 9
| %0.00
|- style="background-color:#E9E9E9" align="left"
! align="center" colspan="4" | Total
|align="center" colspan="5" |258.193
|- style="background-color:#E9E9E9" align="left"
! align="center" colspan="4" | Invalid votes
| align="center" colspan="5" |  14.196
|- style="background-color:#E9E9E9" align="left"
! align="center" colspan="4" | Turnout
| align="center" colspan="5" |  %88.84
|-
|align="left" colspan=10|Ref.: YSK
|}

Kartal

|- style="background-color:#F2F2F2"
| align="center" colspan="3" | Voters
| align="center" colspan="7" | Ballot boxes
|- align="left"
| align="center" colspan="3" | 331,658
| align="center" colspan="7" | 1068
|-
|- style="background-color:#E9E9E9"
|-
! align="center" colspan="4" | Candidates
! align="center" colspan="6" | Results
|- style="background-color:#E9E9E9"
! align="center" colspan="2"|Abb.
! align="center" | Party
! align="center" | Nominee
! align="center" | Vote
! align="center" | Per.
|- align="left"
|bgcolor="#DA251C" width=1|
| CHP
| Republican People's Party
| Altınok Öz
|  128.531
| %44.8
|- align="left"
|bgcolor="#ED8000" width=1|
| AKP
| Justice and Development Party
|  Temurhan Yıldız
| 122.585
| %42.8
|- align="left"
|bgcolor="#D20001" width=1|
| MHP
| Nationalist Movement Party
| Erhan Kekeç
|   17.284  
| %6.04
|- align="left"
|bgcolor="#91007B" width=1|
| HDP
| Peoples' Democratic Party
| Hatice Doğan
|  8.252
| %2.88
|- align="left"
|bgcolor="#D02433" width=1|
| SP
| Felicity Party
| Ali İsmail Kızılgöz
|4.786   
| %1.67
|- align="left"
|bgcolor="#ED1C24" width=1|
| BBP
| Great Union Party
|  Melih Işıksalan
| 1.709
| %0.60
|- align="left"
|bgcolor="#01A7E1" width=1|
| DSP
| Democratic Left Party
| Şahin Kaya
| 1.319
| %0.46
|- align="left"
|bgcolor="#BB0000" width=1|
| İP
| Workers’ Party
| Altan Tüfekçi
| 653
| %0.23
|- align="left"
|bgcolor="#9D1D1E" width=1|
| DP
| Democratic Party
| Müslim Şahanoğlu
| 588
| %0.21
|- align="left"
|bgcolor="#FE0000" width=1|
| BTP
| Independent Turkey Party
| Hüseyin Aras
| 417
| %0.15
|- align="left"
|bgcolor=" " width=1|
| BĞMSZ
| Independent
| Memet Ali Aydoğmuş
| 94
| %0.03
|- align="left"
|bgcolor="#EFDF00" width=1|
| TURK-P
| Social Reconciliation Reform and Development Party
| Serpil Yıldız
|  62 
| %0.02
|- align="left"
|bgcolor="#0C4DA2" width=1|
| LDP
| Liberal Democratic Party
| Ebru Güner
| 55
| %0.02
|- style="background-color:#E9E9E9" align="left"
! align="center" colspan="4" | Total
|align="center" colspan="5" |286.335
|- style="background-color:#E9E9E9" align="left"
! align="center" colspan="4" | Invalid votes
| align="center" colspan="5" |  12.662
|- style="background-color:#E9E9E9" align="left"
! align="center" colspan="4" | Turnout
| align="center" colspan="5" |  %90.15
|-
|align="left" colspan=10|Ref.: YSK
|}

Küçükçekmece

|- style="background-color:#F2F2F2"
| align="center" colspan="3" | Voters
| align="center" colspan="7" | Ballot boxes
|- align="left"
| align="center" colspan="3" | 518,576
| align="center" colspan="7" | 1658
|-
|- style="background-color:#E9E9E9"
|-
! align="center" colspan="4" | Candidates
! align="center" colspan="6" | Results
|- style="background-color:#E9E9E9"
! align="center" colspan="2"|Abb.
! align="center" | Party
! align="center" | Nominee
! align="center" | Vote
! align="center" | Per.
|- align="left"
|bgcolor="#ED8000" width=1|
| AKP
| Justice and Development Party
| Temel Karadeniz
|186.707 
| %42.0
|- align="left"
|bgcolor="#DA251C" width=1|
| CHP
|Republican People's Party
|Gökhan Gümüşdağ
| 175.851
| %39.6
|- align="left"
|bgcolor="#D20001" width=1|
| MHP
| Nationalist Movement Party
|  Muharrem Yıldız
|  37.288  
| %8.41
|- align="left"
|bgcolor="#91007B" width=1|
| HDP
| Peoples' Democratic Party
| Nizamettin Öztürk
| 29.931 
| %6.75
|- align="left"
|bgcolor="#D02433" width=1|
| SP
| Felicity Party
| Varol Şahin
| 7.137
| %1.61
|- align="left"
|bgcolor="#ED1C24" width=1|
| BBP
| Great Union Party
|  Savaş Üngör
| 2.492
| %0.56
|- align="left"
|bgcolor="#FE0000" width=1|
| BTP
| Independent Turkey Party
| Muhammed Kerim Aktacir
| 995
| %0.22
|- align="left"
|bgcolor="#9D1D1E" width=1|
| DP
| Democratic Party
| Gürkan Akbaba
| 957
| %0.22
|- align="left"
|bgcolor="#01A7E1" width=1|
| DSP
| Democratic Left Party
| Çiğdem Mercan
| 943
| %0.21
|- align="left"
|bgcolor="#BB0000" width=1|
| İP
| Workers’ Party
| Ali Aytekin
| 699
| %0.16
|- align="left"
|bgcolor="#0C63CA" width=1|
| MP
| Nation Party
| Hikmet Sofu
| 275
| %0.06
|- align="left"
|bgcolor="#EFDF00" width=1|
| TURK-P
| Social Reconciliation Reform and Development Party
| Birol Dağdeviren
| 182
| %0.04
|- align="left"
|bgcolor="#0C4DA2" width=1|
| LDP
| Liberal Democratic Party
| Alp Pamir
| 117
| %0.03
|- style="background-color:#E9E9E9" align="left"
! align="center" colspan="4" | Total
|align="center" colspan="5" |443.574
|- style="background-color:#E9E9E9" align="left"
! align="center" colspan="4" | Invalid votes
| align="center" colspan="5" |  17.629
|- style="background-color:#E9E9E9" align="left"
! align="center" colspan="4" | Turnout
| align="center" colspan="5" | %88.94 
|-
|align="left" colspan=10|Ref.: YSK
|}

Maltepe

|- style="background-color:#F2F2F2"
| align="center" colspan="3" | Voters
| align="center" colspan="7" | Ballot boxes
|- align="left"
| align="center" colspan="3" | 351,690
| align="center" colspan="7" | 1128
|-
|- style="background-color:#E9E9E9"
|-
! align="center" colspan="4" | Candidates
! align="center" colspan="6" | Results
|- style="background-color:#E9E9E9"
! align="center" colspan="2"|Abb.
! align="center" | Party
! align="center" | Nominee
! align="center" | Vote
! align="center" | Per.
|- align="left"
|bgcolor="#DA251C" width=1|
| CHP
| Republican People's Party
| Ali Kılıç
| 148.907
| %49.4
|- align="left"
|bgcolor="#ED8000" width=1|
| AKP
| Justice and Development Party
| Edibe Sözen Yavuz
| 114.938
| %38.1
|- align="left"
|bgcolor="#D20001" width=1|
| MHP
| Nationalist Movement Party
| Arif Tevetoğlu
|   24.806  
| %8.23
|- align="left"
|bgcolor="#91007B" width=1|
| HDP
| Peoples' Democratic Party
| Zabit Vurdu
|  6.422
| %2.13
|- align="left"
|bgcolor="#D02433" width=1|
| SP
| Felicity Party
| Mustafa Akın
| 2.637
| %0.87
|- align="left"
|bgcolor="#ED1C24" width=1|
| BBP
| Great Union Party
|  Mustafa Şimşek
|  1.296
| %0.43
|- align="left"
|bgcolor="#BB0000" width=1|
| İP
| Workers’ Party
| Şükrü Cengiz Arı
| 628
| %0.21
|- align="left"
|bgcolor="#0C63CA" width=1|
| YP
| Homeland Party (Turkey)
| Ferhat Cebioğlu
|   530
| %0.18
|- align="left"
|bgcolor="#01A7E1" width=1|
| DSP
| Democratic Left Party
| Pelin Savaş
| 369
| %0.12
|- align="left"
|bgcolor="#9D1D1E" width=1|
| DP
| Democratic Party
| Gülay Ezibay
| 352
| %0.12
|- align="left"
|bgcolor="#FE0000" width=1|
| BTP
| Independent Turkey Party
| Fatih Irmak
| 315
| %0.10
|- align="left"
|bgcolor=" " width=1|
| BĞMSZ
| Independent
| Vedat Öztürk
| 82
| %0.03
|- align="left"
|bgcolor="#0C4DA2" width=1|
| LDP
| Liberal Democratic Party
| Volkan Baylan
| 82
| %0.03
|- align="left"
|bgcolor=" " width=1|
| BĞMSZ
| Independent
| Salih Günaçtı
| 55
| %0.02
|- align="left"
|bgcolor=" " width=1|
| BĞMSZ
| Independent
| Erdal Can
| 33
| %0.01
|- style="background-color:#E9E9E9" align="left"
! align="center" colspan="4" | ‘‘‘Total’’’
|align="center" colspan="5" |301.452
|- style="background-color:#E9E9E9" align="left"
! align="center" colspan="4" | ‘‘Invalid votes’’
| align="center" colspan="5" |  11.845
|- style="background-color:#E9E9E9" align="left"
! align="center" colspan="4" | ‘‘Turnout’’
| align="center" colspan="5" |  %89.08
|-
|align="left" colspan=10|‘‘‘Ref.’’’': YSK
|}

Pendik

|- style="background-color:#F2F2F2"
| align="center" colspan="3" | Voters
| align="center" colspan="7" | Ballot boxes
|- align="left"
| align="center" colspan="3" | 447,930
| align="center" colspan="7" | 1432
|-
|- style="background-color:#E9E9E9"
|-
! align="center" colspan="4" | Candidates
! align="center" colspan="6" | Results
|- style="background-color:#E9E9E9"
! align="center" colspan="2"|Abb.
! align="center" | Party
! align="center" | Nominee
! align="center" | Vote
! align="center" | Per.
|- align="left"
|bgcolor="#ED8000" width=1|
| AKP
| Justice and Development Party
| Salih Kenan Şahin
| 202.023
| %52.9
|- align="left"
|bgcolor="#DA251C" width=1|
| CHP
|Republican People's Party
|Tuncer Özyavuz
| 113.356
| %29.6
|- align="left"
|bgcolor="#D20001" width=1|
| MHP
| Nationalist Movement Party
|  İbrahim Coşkun
|  31.154   
| %8.16
|- align="left"
|bgcolor="#D02433" width=1|
| SP
| Felicity Party
| Mahmut Kılıç
|   17.236
| %4.52
|- align="left"
|bgcolor="#91007B" width=1|
| HDP
| Peoples' Democratic Party
| Hüseyin Avras
| 11.375 
| %2.98
|- align="left"
|bgcolor="#ED1C24" width=1|
| BBP
| Great Union Party
|  Sami Daltaban
| 3.917
| %1.03
|- align="left"
|bgcolor="#9D1D1E" width=1|
| DP
| Democratic Party
| Mustafa Kıran
| 858
| %0.22
|- align="left"
|bgcolor="#FE0000" width=1|
| BTP
| Independent Turkey Party
| Kaya Doğan
| 636
| %0.17
|- align="left"
|bgcolor="#BB0000" width=1|
| İP
| Workers’ Party
| Nurhayat Boyraz
| 568
| %0.15
|- align="left"
|bgcolor="#01A7E1" width=1|
| DSP
| Democratic Left Party
| Orhan Yeşilyurt
| 334
| %0.09
|- align="left"
|bgcolor="#DA251C" width=1|
| DYP
| True Path Party
|Hilmi Mısır
|158
| %0.04
|- align="left"
|bgcolor="#0C4DA2" width=1|
| LDP
| Liberal Democratic Party
| Metin Mintaz 
| 122
| %0.03
|- style="background-color:#E9E9E9" align="left"
! align="center" colspan="4" | ‘‘‘Total’’’
| align="center" colspan="5" |381.737
|- style="background-color:#E9E9E9" align="left"
! align="center" colspan="4" | ‘‘Invalid votes’’
| align="center" colspan="5" |  19.405
|- style="background-color:#E9E9E9" align="left"
! align="center" colspan="4" | ‘‘Turnout’’
| align="center" colspan="5" |  %89.55
|-
|align="left" colspan=10|‘‘‘Ref.’’’': YSK
|}

Sancaktepe

|- style="background-color:#F2F2F2"
| align="center" colspan="3" | Voters
| align="center" colspan="7" | Ballot boxes
|- align="left"
| align="center" colspan="3" | 201,880
| align="center" colspan="7" | 644
|-
|- style="background-color:#E9E9E9"
|-
! align="center" colspan="4" | Candidates
! align="center" colspan="6" | Results
|- style="background-color:#E9E9E9"
! align="center" colspan="2"|Abb.
! align="center" | Party
! align="center" | Nominee
! align="center" | Vote
! align="center" | Per.
|- align="left"
|bgcolor="#ED8000" width=1|
| AKP
| Justice and Development Party
| İsmail Erdem
| 85.395
| %49.0
|- align="left"
|bgcolor="#DA251C" width=1|
| CHP
|Republican People's Party
|Özgen Nama
| 60.620
| %34.8
|- align="left"
|bgcolor="#91007B" width=1|
| HDP
| Peoples' Democratic Party
| Engin Aras
|  12.698
| %7.30     
|- align="left"
|bgcolor="#D20001" width=1|
| MHP
| Nationalist Movement Party
| İbrahim Özkan
|     9.551
| %5.49
|- align="left"
|bgcolor="#D02433" width=1|
| SP
| Felicity Party
| Recai Demiryürek
|3.514 
| %2.02   
|- align="left"
|bgcolor="#ED1C24" width=1|
| BBP
| Great Union Party
|  Hasan Güngörmez
| 979
| %0.56
|- align="left"
|bgcolor="#FE0000" width=1|
| BTP
| Independent Turkey Party
| Tuncer Usanmaz
| 429
| %0.25
|- align="left"
|bgcolor="#9D1D1E" width=1|
| DP
| Democratic Party
| Akın Çelik
| 368

| %0.21
|- align="left"
|bgcolor="#BB0000" width=1|
| İP
| Workers’ Party
| Kamil Yakar
| 308
| %0.18
|- align="left"
|bgcolor="#01A7E1" width=1|
| DSP
| Democratic Left Party
| Ayşenur Altan
| 127
| %0.07
|- align="left"
|bgcolor=" " width=1|
| BĞMSZ
| Independent
|  Bilal Taşkın
| 42
| %0.02
|- align="left"
|bgcolor=" " width=1|
| BĞMSZ
| Independent
|İlhan Aşkan
| 22
| %0.01
|- style="background-color:#E9E9E9" align="left"
! align="center" colspan="4" | Total
| align="center" colspan="5" |174.053
|- style="background-color:#E9E9E9" align="left"
! align="center" colspan="4" | Invalid votes
| align="center" colspan="5" |  10.062
|- style="background-color:#E9E9E9" align="left"
! align="center" colspan="4" | Turnout
| align="center" colspan="5" |  %91.20
|-
|align="left" colspan=10|Ref.: YSK
|}

Sarıyer

|- style="background-color:#F2F2F2"
| align="center" colspan="3" | Voters
| align="center" colspan="7" | Ballot boxes
|- align="left"
| align="center" colspan="3" | 243,852
| align="center" colspan="7" | 806
|-
|- style="background-color:#E9E9E9"
|-
! align="center" colspan="4" | Candidates
! align="center" colspan="6" | Results
|- style="background-color:#E9E9E9"
! align="center" colspan="2"|Abb.
! align="center" | Party
! align="center" | Nominee
! align="center" | Vote
! align="center" | Per.
|- align="left"
|bgcolor="#DA251C" width=1|
| CHP
| Republican People's Party
| Şükrü Genç
| 107.313
| %51.1
|- align="left"
|bgcolor="#ED8000" width=1|
| AKP
|  Justice and Development Party
| Mahmut Sedat Özsoy
| 82.478
| %39.2
|- align="left"
|bgcolor="#D20001" width=1|
| MHP
| Nationalist Movement Party
|  Ahmet Özyürek
|  11.625    
| %5.54  
|- align="left"
|bgcolor="#91007B" width=1|
| HDP
| Peoples' Democratic Party
| Önder Birol Bıyık
| 3.507
| %1.67      
|- align="left"
|bgcolor="#D02433" width=1|
| SP
| Felicity Party
| Şükrü Dural
| 2.179
| %1.04
|- align="left"
|bgcolor="#ED1C24" width=1|
| BBP
| Great Union Party
|  Hüseyin Koç
| 1.390
| %0.66
|- align="left"
|bgcolor="#BB0000" width=1|
| İP
| Workers’ Party
| Attila Hakan Ganimgil
|323 
| %0.15
|- align="left"
|bgcolor="#01A7E1" width=1|
| DSP
| Democratic Left Party
| Reyhani Orhan
| 302
| %0.14
|- align="left"
|bgcolor="#0C63CA" width=1|
| YP
| Homeland Party (Turkey)
| Ali Yılmaz
| 261
| %0.12
|- align="left"
|bgcolor="#FE0000" width=1|
| BTP
| Independent Turkey Party
| Mustafa Şakir Aktürk
| 155
| %0.07
|- align="left"
|bgcolor="#9D1D1E" width=1|
| DP
| Democratic Party
| Salim Tarakçı
| 150
| %0.07
|- align="left"
|bgcolor="#0C63CA" width=1|
| MP
| Nation Party
| Orhan Yay
|  74 
| %0.04
|- align="left"
|bgcolor="#EFDF00" width=1|
| TURK-P
| Social Reconciliation Reform and Development Party
| Cevale Bal 
| 68  
| %0.03
|- align="left"
|bgcolor="#0C4DA2" width=1|
| LDP
| Liberal Democratic Party
| Ali Sami Gonca
| 63
| %0.03
|- align="left"
|bgcolor=" " width=1|
| BĞMSZ
| Independent
| Erol Yankuncu
| 56
| %0.02
|- style="background-color:#E9E9E9" align="left"
! align="center" colspan="4" | Total
| align="center" colspan="5" |209.944
|- style="background-color:#E9E9E9" align="left"
! align="center" colspan="4" | Invalid votes
| align="center" colspan="5" | 8.887 
|- style="background-color:#E9E9E9" align="left"
! align="center" colspan="4" | Turnout
| align="center" colspan="5" |  %89.74
|-
|align="left" colspan=10|Ref.: YSK
|}

Silivri

|- style="background-color:#F2F2F2"
| align="center" colspan="3" | Voters
| align="center" colspan="7" | Ballot boxes
|- align="left"
| align="center" colspan="3" | 109,382
| align="center" colspan="7" | 385
|-
|- style="background-color:#E9E9E9"
|-
! align="center" colspan="4" | Candidates
! align="center" colspan="6" | Results
|- style="background-color:#E9E9E9"
! align="center" colspan="2"|Abb.
! align="center" | Party
! align="center" | Nominee
! align="center" | Vote
! align="center" | Per.
|- align="left"
|bgcolor="#DA251C" width=1|
| CHP
| Republican People's Party
| Özcan Işıklar
| 43.980
| %48.8
|- align="left"
|bgcolor="#ED8000" width=1|
| AKP
|  Justice and Development Party
| Tahir Sert
| 38.418
| %42.6
|- align="left"
|bgcolor="#D20001" width=1|
| MHP
| Nationalist Movement Party
| Fatih Kınalı
|3.898
| %4.33
|- align="left"
|bgcolor="#91007B" width=1|
| HDP
| Peoples' Democratic Party
| Yusuf Sumeli
|  1.955
| %2.17
|- align="left"
|bgcolor="#D02433" width=1|
| SP
| Felicity Party
| Kadir Tokalı
|  534
| %0.59
|- align="left"
|bgcolor="#ED1C24" width=1|
| BBP
| Great Union Party
|  Hasan Güner
|  439
| %0.49
|- align="left"
|bgcolor="#9D1D1E" width=1|
| DP
| Democratic Party
| Yasin Elmaslı
| 248
| %0.28
|- align="left"
|bgcolor="#BB0000" width=1|
| İP
| Workers’ Party
| Kadir Koç
| 154
| %0.17
|- align="left"
|bgcolor="#01A7E1" width=1|
| DSP
| Democratic Left Party
| Hüseyin Dertop
| 153
| %0.17
|- align="left"
|bgcolor="#FE0000" width=1|
| BTP
| Independent Turkey Party
| Özel Al
| 105
| %0.12
|- align="left"
|bgcolor="#0094AC" width=1|
| ÖDP
| Özgürlük ve Dayanışma Partisi
| Nurdoğan Özgör
| 91
| %0.10
|- align="left"
|bgcolor="#0C63CA" width=1|
| MP
| Nation Party
| Fuat Çiçekli
| 44
| %0.05
|- align="left"
|bgcolor="#0C4DA2" width=1|
| LDP
| Liberal Democratic Party
| Şenay Akyol 
| 24
| %0.03
|- align="left"
|bgcolor=" " width=1|
| BĞMSZ
| Independent
| Tahsin Doğan
| 15
| %0.01
|- style="background-color:#E9E9E9" align="left"
! align="center" colspan="4" | Total
| align="center" colspan="5" | 90.058
|- style="background-color:#E9E9E9" align="left"
! align="center" colspan="4" | Invalid votes
| align="center" colspan="5" | 4.822
|- style="background-color:#E9E9E9" align="left"
! align="center" colspan="4" | Turnout
| align="center" colspan="5" | %89.61 
|-
|align="left" colspan=10|Ref.: YSK
|}

Sultanbeyli

|- style="background-color:#F2F2F2"
| align="center" colspan="3" | Voters
| align="center" colspan="7" | Ballot boxes
|- align="left"
| align="center" colspan="3" | 193,832
| align="center" colspan="7" | 618
|-
|- style="background-color:#E9E9E9"
|-
! align="center" colspan="4" | Candidates
! align="center" colspan="6" | Results
|- style="background-color:#E9E9E9"
! align="center" colspan="2"|Abb.
! align="center" | Party
! align="center" | Nominee
! align="center" | Vote
! align="center" | Per.
|- align="left"
|bgcolor="#ED8000" width=1|
| AKP
| Justice and Development Party
| Hüseyin Keskin
| 99.967
| %61.1
|- align="left"
|bgcolor="#D02433" width=1|
| SP
| Felicity Party
| Halil İbrahim Arıkan
| 23.575
| %14.4
|- align="left"
|bgcolor="#91007B" width=1|
| HDP
| Peoples' Democratic Party
| Asiye Kolçak
|  18.890
| %11.5      
|- align="left"
|bgcolor="#DA251C" width=1|
| CHP
|Republican People's Party
|Mustafa Çolak
| 11.502
| %7.04
|- align="left"
|bgcolor="#D20001" width=1|
| MHP
| Nationalist Movement Party
| Ümit Gürbüz
|6.385
| %3.91
|- align="left"
|bgcolor="#ED1C24" width=1|
| BBP
| Great Union Party
|  Necdet Kaya
| 1.202
| %0.74
|- align="left"
|bgcolor="#FE0000" width=1|
| BTP
| Independent Turkey Party
| Mustafa Özkan
| 613
| %0.38
|- align="left"
|bgcolor="#9D1D1E" width=1|
| DP
| Democratic Party
| Fatih Yusuf Karakaş
| 555
| %0.34
|- align="left"
|bgcolor="#0C63CA" width=1|
| MP
| Nation Party
| Naci Cebecioğlu
| 255
| %0.16
|- align="left"
|bgcolor="#BB0000" width=1|
| İP
| Workers’ Party
| Mehmet Emin Ayan
| 226
| %0.14
|- align="left"
|bgcolor="#0C4DA2" width=1|
| LDP
| Liberal Democratic Party
| Emine Dilek Balkan
| 91
| %0.06
|- align="left"
|bgcolor="#01A7E1" width=1|
| DSP
| Democratic Left Party
| Meryem Küçükkaya
| 87
| %0.05
|- align="left"
|bgcolor=" " width=1|
| BĞMSZ
| Independent
| Osman Zerey
| 83
| %0.05
|- style="background-color:#E9E9E9" align="left"
! align="center" colspan="4" | Total
| align="center" colspan="5" |163.431
|- style="background-color:#E9E9E9" align="left"
! align="center" colspan="4" | Invalid votes
| align="center" colspan="5" |  11.847
|- style="background-color:#E9E9E9" align="left"
! align="center" colspan="4" | Turnout
| align="center" colspan="5" |  %90.43
|-
|align="left" colspan=10|Ref.: YSK
|}

Sultangazi

|- style="background-color:#F2F2F2"
| align="center" colspan="3" | Voters
| align="center" colspan="7" | Ballot boxes
|- align="left"
| align="center" colspan="3" | 326,711
| align="center" colspan="7" | 1035
|-
|- style="background-color:#E9E9E9"
|-
! align="center" colspan="4" | Candidates
! align="center" colspan="6" | Results
|- style="background-color:#E9E9E9"
! align="center" colspan="2"|Abb.
! align="center" | Party
! align="center" | Nominee
! align="center" | Vote
! align="center" | Per.
|- align="left"
|bgcolor="#ED8000" width=1|
| AKP
| Justice and Development Party
| Cahit Altunay
| 164.404
| %58.5
|- align="left"
|bgcolor="#DA251C" width=1|
| CHP
|Republican People's Party
|Ali Acar
| 65.130
| %23.1
|- align="left"
|bgcolor="#91007B" width=1|
| HDP
| Peoples' Democratic Party
| Meltem Teker
|  20.572
| %7.32     
|- align="left"
|bgcolor="#D02433" width=1|
| SP
| Felicity Party
| Hasan Akpınar
|  16.747 
| %5.96
|- align="left"
|bgcolor="#D20001" width=1|
| MHP
| Nationalist Movement Party
| İlker Doğanyılmaz
|    10.150
| %3.61
|- align="left"
|bgcolor="#ED1C24" width=1|
| BBP
| Great Union Party
|  Hakan Yıldırım
| 1.477
| %0.53
|- align="left"
|bgcolor="#9D1D1E" width=1|
| DP
| Democratic Party
| Şükrü Bozkurt
| 794
| %0.28
|- align="left"
|bgcolor="#FE0000" width=1|
| BTP
| Independent Turkey Party
| Salih Şeker
| 686
| %0.24
|- align="left"
|bgcolor="#000000" width=1|
| HEPAR
| Rights and Equality Party
|  Hamza Erkahraman
| 433   
| %0.15
|- align="left"
|bgcolor="#BB0000" width=1|
| İP
| Workers’ Party
| Nursel Işıksoy
|  268
| %0.10
|- align="left"
|bgcolor="#01A7E1" width=1|
| DSP
| Democratic Left Party
| Mehmet Altınay
| 216
| %0.08
|- align="left"
|bgcolor="#0C4DA2" width=1|
| LDP
| Liberal Democratic Party
| Özlem Gökdemir
| 81
| %0.03
|- align="left"
|bgcolor=" " width=1|
| BĞMSZ
| Independent
| Gökhan Güni
| 35
| %0.01
|- style="background-color:#E9E9E9" align="left"
! align="center" colspan="4" | Total
| align="center" colspan="5" |280.993
|- style="background-color:#E9E9E9" align="left"
! align="center" colspan="4" |Invalid votes
| align="center" colspan="5" |  13.975
|- style="background-color:#E9E9E9" align="left"
! align="center" colspan="4" | Turnout
| align="center" colspan="5" | %90.28 
|-
|align="left" colspan=10|Ref.: YSK
|}

Şile

|- style="background-color:#F2F2F2"
| align="center" colspan="3" | Voters
| align="center" colspan="7" | Ballot boxes
|- align="left"
| align="center" colspan="3" | 24,292
| align="center" colspan="7" | 106
|-
|- style="background-color:#E9E9E9"
|-
! align="center" colspan="4" | Candidates
! align="center" colspan="6" | Results
|- style="background-color:#E9E9E9"
! align="center" colspan="2"|Abb.
! align="center" | Party
! align="center" | Nominee
! align="center" | Vote
! align="center" | Per.
|- align="left"
|bgcolor="#ED8000" width=1|
| AKP
| Justice and Development Party
| Can Tabakoğlu
| 9.528
| %45.1
|- align="left"
|bgcolor="#D20001" width=1|
| MHP
| Nationalist Movement Party
|  Erol Çelebi
|7.624
| %36.1
|- align="left"
|bgcolor="#DA251C" width=1|
| CHP
|Republican People's Party
|Aras Arslan
| 3.267
| %15.4
|- align="left"
|bgcolor="#91007B" width=1|
| HDP
| Peoples' Democratic Party
| Cengiz Bilek
|  303
| %1.44   
|- align="left"
|bgcolor="#D02433" width=1|
| SP
| Felicity Party
| Mehmet Hamdemirci
| 158
| %0.75
|- align="left"
|bgcolor="#9D1D1E" width=1|
| DP
| Democratic Party
| Nahit Melikler
| 65
| %0.31
|- align="left"
|bgcolor="#ED1C24" width=1|
| BBP
| Great Union Party
|  Dursun Al
| 53
| %0.25
|- align="left"
|bgcolor="#BB0000" width=1|
| İP
| Workers’ Party
| Güzin Baş
| 38
| %0.18
|- align="left"
|bgcolor="#FE0000" width=1|
| BTP
| Independent Turkey Party
| Halit Levent
| 26
| %0.12
|- align="left"
|bgcolor="#000000" width=1|
| HEPAR
| Rights and Equality Party
|  Levent Özsoy
|  19 
| %0.09
|- align="left"
|bgcolor="#01A7E1" width=1|
| DSP
| Democratic Left Party
| Selami Özsoy
| 16
| %0.08
|- align="left"
|bgcolor="#0C4DA2" width=1|
| LDP
| Liberal Democratic Party
| Ali Rıza Özören
| 5
| %0.02
|- style="background-color:#E9E9E9" align="left"
! align="center" colspan="4" | Total
| align="center" colspan="5" |21.102
|- style="background-color:#E9E9E9" align="left"
! align="center" colspan="4" | Invalid votes
| align="center" colspan="5" |  1.265
|- style="background-color:#E9E9E9" align="left"
! align="center" colspan="4" | Turnout
| align="center" colspan="5" |  %92.08
|-
|align="left" colspan=10|Ref.: YSK
|}

Şişli

|- style="background-color:#F2F2F2"
| align="center" colspan="3" | Voters
| align="center" colspan="7" | Ballot boxes
|- align="left"
| align="center" colspan="3" | 209,951
| align="center" colspan="7" | 679
|-
|- style="background-color:#E9E9E9"
|-
! align="center" colspan="4" | Candidates
! align="center" colspan="6" | Results
|- style="background-color:#E9E9E9"
! align="center" colspan="2"|Abb.
! align="center" | Party
! align="center" | Nominee
! align="center" | Vote
! align="center" | Per.
|- align="left"
| bgcolor="#DA251C" width=1|
| CHP
| Republican People's Party
| Hasan Hayri İnönü
|  108.523
| %61.5
|- align="left"
|bgcolor="#ED8000" width=1|
| AKP
| Justice and Development Party
| Mukadder Başeğmez
| 48.531
| %27.5
|- align="left"
|bgcolor="#91007B" width=1|
| HDP
| Peoples' Democratic Party
| Ayşe Berktay Hacımirzaoğlu
|  7.140
| %4.05     
|- align="left"
|bgcolor="#D20001" width=1|
| MHP
| Nationalist Movement Party
| Mustafa Veysel Güldoğan
|7.139
| %4.05
|- align="left"
|bgcolor="#BB0000" width=1|
| İP
| Workers’ Party
| Ümit Ertaç Zileli
| 1.732
| %0.98
|- align="left"
|bgcolor="#D02433" width=1|
| SP
| Felicity Party
| Engin Yılmaz
| 1.306
| %0.74
|- align="left"
|bgcolor="#ED1C24" width=1|
| BBP
| Great Union Party
|  Yasemin Çiçek
|  865
| %0.49
|- align="left"
|bgcolor="#0C63CA" width=1|
| YP
| Homeland Party
| Muhammed Aslanoğlu
|    246
| %0.14
|- align="left"
|bgcolor="#01A7E1" width=1|
| DSP
| Democratic Left Party
| Mahir Yıldırım
| 221
| %0.13
|- align="left"
|bgcolor="#9D1D1E" width=1|
| DP
| Democratic Party
| Yasin Evin
| 214
| %0.12
|- align="left"
|bgcolor="#FE0000" width=1|
| BTP
| Independent Turkey Party
| İsmail Sağır
| 164
| %0.09
|- align="left"
|bgcolor="#DA251C" width=1|
| DYP
| True Path Party
|Sertan Kırço 
| 67
| %0.04
|- align="left"
|bgcolor="#0C4DA2" width=1|
| LDP
| Liberal Democratic Party
| Aydın Rozental
| 63
| %0.04
|- align="left"
|bgcolor=" " width=1|
| BĞMSZ
| Independent
| Yusuf Alacadağ
| 30
| %0.01
|- align="left"
|bgcolor="#0C63CA" width=1|
| MP
| Nation Party
| Salim Yılmaz
| 23
| %0.01
|- style="background-color:#E9E9E9" align="left"
! align="center" colspan="4" | Total
| align="center" colspan="5" |176.264
|- style="background-color:#E9E9E9" align="left"
! align="center" colspan="4" | Invalid votes
| align="center" colspan="5" |  6.451
|- style="background-color:#E9E9E9" align="left"
! align="center" colspan="4" | Turnout
| align="center" colspan="5" |  %87.03
|-
|align="left" colspan=10|Ref.: YSK
|}

Tuzla

|- style="background-color:#F2F2F2"
| align="center" colspan="3" | Voters
| align="center" colspan="7" | Ballot boxes
|- align="left"
| align="center" colspan="3" | 142,025
| align="center" colspan="7" | 459
|-
|- style="background-color:#E9E9E9"
|-
! align="center" colspan="4" | Candidates
! align="center" colspan="6" | Results
|- style="background-color:#E9E9E9"
! align="center" colspan="2"|Abb.
! align="center" | Party
! align="center" | Nominee
! align="center" | Vote
! align="center" | Per.
|- align="left"
|bgcolor="#ED8000" width=1|
| AKP
| Justice and Development Party
| Şadi Yazıcı
| 58.918
| %48.0
|- align="left"
|bgcolor="#DA251C" width=1|
| CHP
|Republican People's Party
|Cemil Ekşi
| 48.461
| %39.5
|- align="left"
|bgcolor="#D20001" width=1|
| MHP
| Nationalist Movement Party
| Adil Erkoç 
|   6.256   
| %5.10
|- align="left"
|bgcolor="#91007B" width=1|
| HDP
| Peoples' Democratic Party
| Hasan Özdemir
| 4.160 
| %3.39       
|- align="left"
|bgcolor="#D02433" width=1|
| SP
| Felicity Party
| Ahmet Dikici
|   2.272 
| %1.85
|- align="left"
|bgcolor="#ED1C24" width=1|
| BBP
| Great Union Party
| Mehmet Demirci 
|  1.618
| %1.32
|- align="left"
|bgcolor="#9D1D1E" width=1|
| DP
| Democratic Party
| Ahmet Ali Soğuksulu
| 279
| %0.23
|- align="left"
|bgcolor="#01A7E1" width=1|
| DSP
| Democratic Left Party
| Meryem Tekin
| 233
| %0.19
|- align="left"
|bgcolor="#BB0000" width=1|
| İP
| Workers’ Party
| Hüseyin Kılıç
| 186
| %0.15
|- align="left"
|bgcolor="#FE0000" width=1|
| BTP
| Independent Turkey Party
| Hasan Gürdal
| 138
| %0.11
|- align="left"
|bgcolor="#0C4DA2" width=1|
| LDP
| Liberal Democratic Party
| Ali Işık
| 30
| %0.02
|- align="left"
|bgcolor=" " width=1|
| BĞMSZ
| Independent
| Musa Tuğra
| 29
| %0.02
|- style="background-color:#E9E9E9" align="left"
! align="center" colspan="4" | Total
| align="center" colspan="5" |122.580
|- style="background-color:#E9E9E9" align="left"
! align="center" colspan="4" | Invalid votes
| align="center" colspan="5" |  6.179
|- style="background-color:#E9E9E9" align="left"
! align="center" colspan="4" | Turnout
| align="center" colspan="5" |  %90.66
|-
|align="left" colspan=10|Ref.: YSK
|}

Ümraniye

|- style="background-color:#F2F2F2"
| align="center" colspan="3" | Voters
| align="center" colspan="7" | Ballot boxes
|- align="left"
| align="center" colspan="3" | 460,049
| align="center" colspan="7" | 1474
|-
|- style="background-color:#E9E9E9"
|-
! align="center" colspan="4" | Candidates
! align="center" colspan="6" | Results
|- style="background-color:#E9E9E9"
! align="center" colspan="2"|Abb.
! align="center" | Party
! align="center" | Nominee
! align="center" | Vote
! align="center" | Per.
|- align="left"
|bgcolor="#ED8000" width=1|
| AKP
| Justice and Development Party
| Hasan Can
| 194.211
| %49.4
|- align="left"
|bgcolor="#DA251C" width=1|
| CHP
|Republican People's Party
|Sacit Eyüboğlu
| 116.902
| %29.7
|- align="left"
|bgcolor="#D20001" width=1|
| MHP
| Nationalist Movement Party
| Sabri Şenel
|40.446
| %10.3
|- align="left"
|bgcolor="#D02433" width=1|
| SP
| Felicity Party
| Yusuf Yüksel 
|  20.251 
| %5.16
|- align="left"
|bgcolor="#91007B" width=1|
| HDP
| Peoples' Democratic Party
| Rıza Karaman
| 13.917
| %3.55       
|- align="left"
|bgcolor="#ED1C24" width=1|
| BBP
| Great Union Party
| Bülent Taş 
| 3.315 
| %0.84
|- align="left"
|bgcolor="#0C63CA" width=1|
| YP
|Homeland Party
| İsmail Uzun
| 720
| %0.18
|- align="left"
|bgcolor="#BB0000" width=1|
| İP
| Workers’ Party
| Ünal İnan Albayrak
| 715

| %0.18 
|- align="left"
|bgcolor="#FE0000" width=1|
| BTP
| Independent Turkey Party
| Resul Balcı
| 588
| %0.15 
|- align="left"
|bgcolor="#01A7E1" width=1|
| DSP
| Democratic Left Party
| Nesim Pakır
| 477
| %0.12
|- align="left"
|bgcolor="#9D1D1E" width=1|
| DP
| Democratic Party
| Mete Çimir
| 294
| %0.07
|- align="left"
|bgcolor="#0C63CA" width=1|
| MP
| Nation Party
| Salim Demirezen
|   244
| %0.06
|- align="left"
|bgcolor=" " width=1|
| BĞMSZ
| Independent
| Kemal Şimşek
| 195
| %0.04
|- align="left"
|bgcolor="#0C4DA2" width=1|
| LDP
| Liberal Democratic Party
| Hazım Kurdoğlu
| 127
| %0.03
|- align="left"
|bgcolor="#DA251C" width=1|
| DYP
| True Path Party
|Hakan Ünal
|110
| %0.03
|- style="background-color:#E9E9E9" align="left"
! align="center" colspan="4" | Total
| align="center" colspan="5" |392.512
|- style="background-color:#E9E9E9" align="left"
! align="center" colspan="4" | Invalid votes
| align="center" colspan="5" |  21.038
|- style="background-color:#E9E9E9" align="left"
! align="center" colspan="4" | Turnout
| align="center" colspan="5" |  %89.91
|-
|align="left" colspan=10|Ref.: YSK
|}

Üsküdar

|- style="background-color:#F2F2F2"
| align="center" colspan="3" | Voters
| align="center" colspan="7" | Ballot boxeses
|- align="left"
| align="center" colspan="3" | 399,450
| align="center" colspan="7" | 1288
|-
|- style="background-color:#E9E9E9"
|-
! align="center" colspan="4" | Candidates
! align="center" colspan="6" | Results
|- style="background-color:#E9E9E9"
! align="center" colspan="2"|Abb.
! align="center" | Party
! align="center" | Nominee
! align="center" | Vote
! align="center" | Per.
|- align="left"
|bgcolor="#ED8000" width=1|
| AKP
| Justice and Development Party
| Hilmi Türkmen
| 156.369
| %45.6
|- align="left"
|bgcolor="#DA251C" width=1|
| CHP
|Republican People's Party
|İhsan Özkes
| 148.105

| %43.2
|- align="left"
|bgcolor="#D20001" width=1|
| MHP
| Nationalist Movement Party
| Habib Suiçmez
|   18.743
| %5.47
|- align="left"
|bgcolor="#D02433" width=1|
| SP
| Felicity Party
| Erol Belen
| 7.570
| %2.21
|- align="left"
|bgcolor="#91007B" width=1|
| HDP
| Peoples' Democratic Party
| Sabri Bingöl
|  6.478
| %1.89    
|- align="left"
|bgcolor="#ED1C24" width=1|
| BBP
| Great Union Party
|  Abdullah Genç
| 2.130
| %0.62
|- align="left"
|bgcolor="#BB0000" width=1|
| İP
| Workers’ Party
| Perihan Işık Özben
| 648
| %0.19
|- align="left"
|bgcolor="#0C63CA" width=1|
| YP
| Homeland Party
| Melih Çelik
| 555
| %0.16
|- align="left"
|bgcolor="#000000" width=1|
| HEPAR
| Rights and Equality Party
|  İskender Berrak
|   509
| %0.15
|- align="left"
|bgcolor="#9D1D1E" width=1|
| DP
| Democratic Party
| Nurettin İçer
| 342
| %0.10
|- align="left"
|bgcolor="#FE0000" width=1|
| BTP
| Independent Turkey Party
| Ahmet Mithat Cabi
| 336
| %0.10
|- align="left"
|bgcolor="#01A7E1" width=1|
| DSP
| Democratic Left Party
| Cengiz Sepkin
| 294
| %0.09
|- align="left"
|bgcolor="#0C63CA" width=1|
| MP
| Nation Party
| Abdullatif Metin
| 136  
| %0.04
|- align="left"
|bgcolor="#0C4DA2" width=1|
| LDP
| Liberal Democratic Party
| Şahin Civelek
|  112
| %0.03
|- align="left"
|bgcolor=" " width=1|
| BĞMSZ
| Independent
| Onur Berispek
| 93
| %0.03
|- style="background-color:#E9E9E9" align="left"
! align="center" colspan="4" | Total
| align="center" colspan="5" |342.420
|- style="background-color:#E9E9E9" align="left"
! align="center" colspan="4" | Invalid votes
| align="center" colspan="5" |  15.885
|- style="background-color:#E9E9E9" align="left"
! align="center" colspan="4" | Turnout
| align="center" colspan="5" |  %89.71
|-
|align="left" colspan=10|Ref.: YSK
|}

Zeytinburnu

|- style="background-color:#F2F2F2"
| align="center" colspan="3" | Voters
| align="center" colspan="7" | Ballot boxeses
|- align="left"
| align="center" colspan="3" | 199,818
| align="center" colspan="7" | 642
|-
|- style="background-color:#E9E9E9"
|-
! align="center" colspan="4" | Candidates
! align="center" colspan="6" | Results
|- style="background-color:#E9E9E9"
! align="center" colspan="2"|Abb.
! align="center" | Party
! align="center" | Nominee
! align="center" | Vote
! align="center" | Per.
|- align="left"
|bgcolor="#ED8000" width=1|
| AKP
| Justice and Development Party
| Murat Aydın
| 81.615
| %49.1
|- align="left"
|bgcolor="#DA251C" width=1|
| CHP
|Republican People's Party
|Mustafa Fazlıoğlu
| 48.277
| %29.0
|- align="left"
|bgcolor="#D20001" width=1|
| MHP
| Nationalist Movement Party
| Fetih Ahmet Alparslan
|15.747
| %9.49
|- align="left"
|bgcolor="#91007B" width=1|
| HDP
| Peoples' Democratic Party
| Hüseyin Güngör
|  14.905
| %8.98     
|- align="left"
|bgcolor="#D02433" width=1|
| SP
| Felicity Party
| Yahya Kemal Hayırlıoğlu
|  3.106
| %1.87
|- align="left"
|bgcolor="#ED1C24" width=1|
| BBP
| Great Union Party
|  Şeref Kanber
| 764
| %0.46
|- align="left"
|bgcolor="#FE0000" width=1|
| BTP
| Independent Turkey Party
| Sevda Ertürk
| 449
| %0.27
|- align="left"
|bgcolor="#0C63CA" width=1|
| YP
| Homeland Party
| Pınar Bal Yıldırım
| 320
| %0.19    
|- align="left"
|bgcolor="#01A7E1" width=1|
| DSP
| Democratic Left Party
|Ersan Yılmaz 
|  249
| %0.15 
|- align="left"
|bgcolor="#BB0000" width=1|
| İP
| Workers’ Party
| Mehmet Kurnaz
| 190
| %0.11
|- align="left"
|bgcolor="#9D1D1E" width=1|
| DP
| Democratic Party
| İlhan Pehlivan
| 139
| %0.08
|- align="left"
|bgcolor="#DA251C" width=1|
| DYP
| True Path Party
|Naciye Sipahioğlu
| 56
| %0.03
|- align="left"
|bgcolor="#0C63CA" width=1|
| MP
| Nation Party
| Meryem Koçoğlu
| 50
| %0.03
|- align="left"
|bgcolor="#0C4DA2" width=1|
| LDP
| Liberal Democratic Party
| Sezer Duman
| 47
| %0.02
|- align="left"
|bgcolor=" " width=1|
| BĞMSZ
|  Independent
| Hasan Güner
| 46
| %0.02
|- align="left"
|bgcolor=" " width=1|
| BĞMSZ
|  Independent
| Ahmet Arslan
| 25
| %0.01
|- style="background-color:#E9E9E9" align="left"
! align="center" colspan="4" | Total
| align="center" colspan="5" |165.985
|- style="background-color:#E9E9E9" align="left"
! align="center" colspan="4" | Invalid votes
| align="center" colspan="5" |  9.906
|- style="background-color:#E9E9E9" align="left"
! align="center" colspan="4" | Turnout
| align="center" colspan="5" |  %88.03
|-
|align="left" colspan=10|Ref.: YSK
|}

References

Elections in Istanbul
2014 in Istanbul
2014 Turkish local elections